

2001–2100 

|-
| 2001 Einstein || 1973 EB || Albert Einstein (1879–1955), German-born, Swiss–American physicist and Nobelist || 
|-id=002
| 2002 Euler ||  || Leonhard Euler (1707–1783), Swiss mathematician and physicists || 
|-id=003
| 2003 Harding || 6559 P-L || Karl Ludwig Harding (1765–1834), German astronomer || 
|-id=004
| 2004 Lexell ||  || Anders Johan Lexell (1740–1784), Swedish-Russian astronomer and mathematician || 
|-id=005
| 2005 Hencke || 1973 RA || Karl Ludwig Hencke (1793–1866), German astronomer || 
|-id=006
| 2006 Polonskaya ||  || Elena Kazimirtchak-Polonskaïa (1902–1992), Ukrainian astronomer (comets) || 
|-id=007
| 2007 McCuskey || 1963 SQ || Sidney W. McCuskey (1907–1979), American observatory director || 
|-id=008
| 2008 Konstitutsiya ||  || 1977 Constitution of the Soviet Union || 
|-id=009
| 2009 Voloshina || 1968 UL || Vera Voloshina (1919–1941), Russian partisan || 
|-id=010
| 2010 Chebyshev ||  || Pafnuty Chebyshev (1821–1884), Russian mathematician || 
|-id=011
| 2011 Veteraniya ||  || Russian for "Veterans" (of World War II) || 
|-id=012
| 2012 Guo Shou-Jing ||  || Guo Shoujing (1231–1316), Chinese astronomer and mathematician || 
|-id=013
| 2013 Tucapel ||  || Mapuche (Araucanian) chief || 
|-id=014
| 2014 Vasilevskis || 1973 JA || Stanislaus Vasilevskis (died 1988), Latvian-born American astronomer || 
|-id=015
| 2015 Kachuevskaya ||  || Natasha Kachuevskaya, Russian soldier during WWII who was killed in the battle of Stalingrad || 
|-id=016
| 2016 Heinemann || 1938 SE || Karl Heinemann (1898–1970), German astronomer at ARI || 
|-id=017
| 2017 Wesson || A903 SC || Mary Joan Wesson Bardwell (1924–2021), wife of American astronomer Conrad M. Bardwell (1926–2010), who was a research associate at the Minor Planet Center || 
|-id=018
| 2018 Schuster || 1931 UC || Hans-Emil Schuster (born 1934), German astronomer and discoverer of minor planets || 
|-id=019
| 2019 van Albada ||  || Gale Bruno van Albada (1911–1972), Dutch astronomer || 
|-id=020
| 2020 Ukko || 1936 FR || Ukko, Finnish supreme god || 
|-id=021
| 2021 Poincaré || 1936 MA || Henri Poincaré (1854–1912), French mathematician || 
|-id=022
| 2022 West || 1938 CK || Richard Martin West (born 1941), Danish astronomer and discoverer of minor planets || 
|-id=023
| 2023 Asaph || 1952 SA || Asaph Hall (1829–1907), American astronomer || 
|-id=024
| 2024 McLaughlin || 1952 UR || Dean Benjamin McLaughlin (1901–1965), American spectroscopist and geologist || 
|-id=025
| 2025 Nortia || 1953 LG || Nortia, Etruscan goddess of fortune || 
|-id=026
| 2026 Cottrell || 1955 FF || Frederick Gardner Cottrell (1877–1948), American businessman chemist, inventor and philanthropist || 
|-id=027
| 2027 Shen Guo ||  || Shen Kuo (1031–1095), astronomer || 
|-id=028
| 2028 Janequeo ||  || Wife of Mapuche (Araucanian) chief Guepotan || 
|-id=029
| 2029 Binomi || 1969 RB || Fictional mathematician, jokingly referred to as the inventor of mathematical formula, such as the Binomial theorem || 
|-id=030
| 2030 Belyaev ||  || Pavel Belyayev (1925–1970), Soviet cosmonaut, officer and fighter pilot || 
|-id=031
| 2031 BAM ||  || builders of Baikal Amur Mainline (BAM) || 
|-id=032
| 2032 Ethel || 1970 OH || Ethel Lilian Voynich (1864–1960), British author || 
|-id=033
| 2033 Basilea || 1973 CA || The city of Basel in Switzerland || 
|-id=034
| 2034 Bernoulli || 1973 EE || Several mathematicians of the Bernoulli family, in particular Jacob (1654–1705), Johann (1667–1748) and Daniel (1700–1782) || 
|-id=035
| 2035 Stearns || 1973 SC || Carl Leo Stearns (1892–1972), American astronomer || 
|-id=036
| 2036 Sheragul ||  || Sheragul, Siberian village in Russia || 
|-id=037
| 2037 Tripaxeptalis || 1973 UB || 3 times 679 Pax and 7 times 291 Alice || 
|-id=038
| 2038 Bistro || 1973 WF || Bistro, a type of restaurant || 
|-id=039
| 2039 Payne-Gaposchkin || 1974 CA || Cecilia Payne-Gaposchkin (1900–1979), British-born American astronomer || 
|-id=040
| 2040 Chalonge || 1974 HA || Daniel Chalonge (1895–1977), French astronomer || 
|-id=041
| 2041 Lancelot || 2523 P-L || Lancelot, Arthurian knight || 
|-id=042
| 2042 Sitarski || 4633 P-L || Grzegorz Sitarski, Polish astronomer at the Polish Academy of Sciences, who studied the motion of comets || 
|-id=043
| 2043 Ortutay || 1936 TH || Gyula Ortutay (1910–1978), Hungarian cultural leader || 
|-id=044
| 2044 Wirt || 1950 VE || Carl A. Wirtanen (1910–1990), American astronomer and discoverer of minor planets and comets || 
|-id=045
| 2045 Peking ||  || Beijing, capital of the People's Republic of China || 
|-id=046
| 2046 Leningrad ||  || Leningrad, city in the USSR || 
|-id=047
| 2047 Smetana ||  || Bedřich Smetana (1824–1884), Czech composer || 
|-id=048
| 2048 Dwornik || 1973 QA || Stephen E. Dwornik, American planetary geologist || 
|-id=049
| 2049 Grietje || 1973 SH || G. A. M. Haring-Gehrels, sister-in-law of Dutch-born American astronomer Tom Gehrels † || 
|-id=050
| 2050 Francis || 1974 KA || Fred and Kay Francis, parents of discoverer || 
|-id=051
| 2051 Chang || 1976 UC || Zhang Yuzhe (Y.C. Chang), Chinese astronomer, director of the Purple Mountain Observatory || 
|-id=052
| 2052 Tamriko || 1976 UN || Tamara West, wife of discoverer Richard Martin West || 
|-id=053
| 2053 Nuki || 1976 UO || Nodari West, son of discoverer Richard Martin West || 
|-id=054
| 2054 Gawain || 4097 P-L || Gawain, Arthurian knight || 
|-id=055
| 2055 Dvořák || 1974 DB || Antonín Dvořák (1841–1904), Czech composer || 
|-id=056
| 2056 Nancy || A909 TB || Nancy Lou Zissell Marsden, wife of Brian G. Marsden || 
|-id=057
| 2057 Rosemary || 1934 RQ || Rosemary Birky Hoffmann Scholl, first wife of Hans Scholl || 
|-id=058
| 2058 Róka || 1938 BH || Gedeon Róka (1906–1974), Hungarian science writer † ‡ || 
|-id=059
| 2059 Baboquivari || 1963 UA || Babioquivari, mountain sacred to the Tohono O'odham of northern Mexico and southern Arizona || 
|-id=060
| 2060 Chiron || 1977 UB || Chiron, a centaur from Greek mythology || 
|-id=061
| 2061 Anza || 1960 UA || Juan Bautista de Anza (1736–1788), Spanish explorer, military officer, and Governor of the Province of New Mexico under the Spanish Empire || 
|-id=062
| 2062 Aten || 1976 AA || Aten, Egyptian god || 
|-id=063
| 2063 Bacchus || 1977 HB || Bacchus (Dionysus), Roman god || 
|-id=064
| 2064 Thomsen || 1942 RQ || Ivan Leslie Thomsen (1910–1969), New Zealand astronomer || 
|-id=065
| 2065 Spicer || 1959 RN || Edward H. Spicer (1906–1983), anthropologist || 
|-id=066
| 2066 Palala || 1934 LB || Palala River, tributary of the Limpopo River, South Africa || 
|-id=067
| 2067 Aksnes || 1936 DD || Kaare Aksnes, astronomer || 
|-id=068
| 2068 Dangreen || 1948 AD || Daniel W. E. Green, American observatory worker, involved in the MPC's transition from Cincinnati to Cambridge in 1978 || 
|-id=069
| 2069 Hubble || 1955 FT || Edwin Hubble (1889–1953), American astronomer || 
|-id=070
| 2070 Humason || 1964 TQ || Milton L. Humason (1891–1972), American astronomer || 
|-id=071
| 2071 Nadezhda || 1971 QS || Nadezhda Konstantinovna Krupskaya (1869–1939), educator, wife of Vladimir Lenin || 
|-id=072
| 2072 Kosmodemyanskaya ||  || Lubov' Timofeevna Kosmodemyanskaya (1900–1978), mother of Soviet heroes Zoya Kosmodemyanskaya and Aleksandr Kosmodemyansky || 
|-id=073
| 2073 Janáček || 1974 DK || Leoš Janáček (1854–1928), Czech composer || 
|-id=074
| 2074 Shoemaker || 1974 UA || Eugene Shoemaker (1928–1997), American astronomer || 
|-id=075
| 2075 Martinez || 1974 VA || Hugo Arturo Martinez (1890–1976), Argentinian astronomer at La Plata Observatory || 
|-id=076
| 2076 Levin || 1974 WA || Boris Yulevich Levin (1912–1989), Russian astronomer and geophysicist || 
|-id=077
| 2077 Kiangsu || 1974 YA || Jiangsu, province in eastern China || 
|-id=078
| 2078 Nanking || 1975 AD || Nanjing, Chinese city near the Purple Mountain Observatory || 
|-id=079
| 2079 Jacchia || 1976 DB || Luigi Giuseppe Jacchia, Italian-born American astronomer || 
|-id=080
| 2080 Jihlava || 1976 DG || Jihlava, city in the Czech Republic || 
|-id=081
| 2081 Sázava || 1976 DH || Sázava River, tributary of Vltava River, Czech Republic || 
|-id=082
| 2082 Galahad || 7588 P-L || Galahad, Arthurian knight || 
|-id=083
| 2083 Smither || 1973 WB || John C. Smith, American astronomer involved with the Palomar Planet-Crossing Asteroid Survey || 
|-id=084
| 2084 Okayama || 1935 CK || Okayama, Okayama, Japan || 
|-id=085
| 2085 Henan || 1965 YA || Henan, province in China || 
|-id=086
| 2086 Newell || 1966 BC || Homer E. Newell Jr. (1915–1983), American physicist and space scientist || 
|-id=087
| 2087 Kochera || 1975 YC || Theodor Kocher (1841–1917), Swiss surgeon and Nobel laureate || 
|-id=088
| 2088 Sahlia || 1976 DJ || Hermann Sahli (1856–1933), Swiss physician and professor of internal medicine at Berne University || 
|-id=089
| 2089 Cetacea || 1977 VF || Cetacea, clade of aquatic mammals such as whales and dolphins || 
|-id=090
| 2090 Mizuho || 1978 EA || Daughter of Japanese discoverer Takeshi Urata || 
|-id=091
| 2091 Sampo || 1941 HO || Sampo, magical artifact from Finnish mythology || 
|-id=092
| 2092 Sumiana || 1969 UP || Sumy, Ukraine || 
|-id=093
| 2093 Genichesk || 1971 HX || Henichesk, city in north-eastern Ukraine, birthplace of discoverer Tamara Smirnova || 
|-id=094
| 2094 Magnitka ||  || Magnitogorsk, Russian industrial city || 
|-id=095
| 2095 Parsifal || 6036 P-L || Parsifal, Arthurian knight || 
|-id=096
| 2096 Väinö || 1939 UC || Väinämöinen, from Finnish mythology || 
|-id=097
| 2097 Galle || 1953 PV || Johann Gottfried Galle (1812–1910), German astronomer || 
|-id=098
| 2098 Zyskin || 1972 QE || Lev Zyskin (1930–1994), Professor at the Crimean medical institute || 
|-id=099
| 2099 Öpik || 1977 VB || Ernst Öpik (1893–1985), Estonian astronomer || 
|-id=100
| 2100 Ra-Shalom || 1978 RA || Egyptian god Ra + Hebrew Shalom, in honour of the Camp David Peace Accords of 1978 || 
|}

2101–2200 

|-
| 2101 Adonis || 1936 CA || Adonis, Greek mythological youth || 
|-id=102
| 2102 Tantalus || 1975 YA || Tantalus, Greek mythological figure || 
|-id=103
| 2103 Laverna || 1960 FL || Laverna, protecting divinity of thieves and imposters || 
|-id=104
| 2104 Toronto || 1963 PD || University of Toronto, during whose sesquicentennial celebration it was discovered || 
|-id=105
| 2105 Gudy || 1976 DA || Gudrun Werner, friend of astronomer Hans-Emil Schuster who discovered this minor planet || 
|-id=106
| 2106 Hugo || 1936 UF || Victor Hugo (1802–1885), French writer || 
|-id=107
| 2107 Ilmari || 1941 VA || Ilmarinen, Finnish mythology || 
|-id=108
| 2108 Otto Schmidt ||  || Otto Schmidt (1891–1956), Soviet mathematician, geophysicist, astronomer polar researcher, and author || 
|-id=109
| 2109 Dhotel ||  || André Dhôtel (1901–1991), French writer awarded with the Grand Prix de Litterature de l'Academie Francaise. He was a friend of the family of the discoverer, Sylvain Arend. || 
|-id=110
| 2110 Moore-Sitterly || 1962 RD || Charlotte Moore Sitterly (1898–1990), American astronomer || 
|-id=111
| 2111 Tselina || 1969 LG || Virgin Lands Campaign, soil development in the USSR || 
|-id=112
| 2112 Ulyanov || 1972 NP || Aleksandr Ulyanov (1866–1887), Lenin's eldest brother || 
|-id=113
| 2113 Ehrdni ||  || Ehrdni Teldzhievich Delikov (1922–1942), Soviet hero of the Great Patriotic War || 
|-id=114
| 2114 Wallenquist || 1976 HA || Åke Wallenquist (1904–1994), Swedish astronomer and a discoverer of minor planets || 
|-id=115
| 2115 Irakli || 1976 UD || Irakli West, son of discoverer Richard Martin West || 
|-id=116
| 2116 Mtskheta || 1976 UM || Mtskheta, city in Georgia (country) || 
|-id=117
| 2117 Danmark || 1978 AC || Denmark, native country of discoverer Richard Martin West || 
|-id=118
| 2118 Flagstaff || 1978 PB || Flagstaff, Arizona, home of the Lowell Observatory || 
|-id=119
| 2119 Schwall || 1930 QG || August Schwall (1877–1947), staff member at Heidelberg Observatory, Germany || 
|-id=120
| 2120 Tyumenia || 1967 RM || Tyumen Oblast, district of the Russian SFSR (now Russia) || 
|-id=121
| 2121 Sevastopol || 1971 ME || Sevastopol, city on the Crimean peninsula || 
|-id=122
| 2122 Pyatiletka || 1971 XB || Five-Year Plans of the USSR, named on the 50th anniversary of its adoption || 
|-id=123
| 2123 Vltava ||  || Vltava River in the Czech Republic || 
|-id=124
| 2124 Nissen || 1974 MK || Juan Jose Nissen (1901–1978), Argentinian astronomer and first director of the Felix Aguilar Observatory || 
|-id=125
| 2125 Karl-Ontjes || 2005 P-L || Karl-Ontjes Groeneveld (born 1935), German physicist and brother of astronomer Ingrid van Houten-Groeneveld, who co-discovered this minor planet || 
|-id=126
| 2126 Gerasimovich || 1970 QZ || Boris Petrovich Gerasimovich (1889–1937), Russian astrophysicist and director of the Pulkovo Observatory || 
|-id=127
| 2127 Tanya ||  || Tanya Savicheva (1930–1944), a young Russian schoolgirl who died in Siege of Leningrad || 
|-id=128
| 2128 Wetherill || 1973 SB || George Wetherill (1925–2006), American geochemist and planetary geologist || 
|-id=129
| 2129 Cosicosi || 1973 SJ || Italian characterization of indifference || 
|-id=130
| 2130 Evdokiya ||  || Evdokiya Efimovna Shchelokova, mother of the discoverer Lyudmila Zhuravleva || 
|-id=131
| 2131 Mayall || 1975 RA || Nicholas Mayall (1906–1993), American astronomer || 
|-id=132
| 2132 Zhukov ||  || Georgij Konstantinovich Zhukov (1896–1974), Soviet military commander || 
|-id=133
| 2133 Franceswright || 1976 WB || Frances Woodworth Wright (1897–1989), American astronomer at Harvard University || 
|-id=134
| 2134 Dennispalm || 1976 YB || Dennis Palm (1945–1974), amateur astronomer and assistant at Palomar Observatory || 
|-id=135
| 2135 Aristaeus || 1977 HA || Aristaeus, Greek god || 
|-id=136
| 2136 Jugta || 1933 OC || Jay U. Gunter (1911–1994), author of Tonight's Asteroids (hence, J.U.G. T.A.) || 
|-id=137
| 2137 Priscilla || 1936 QZ || Priscilla Fairfield Bok (1896–1975), American astronomer, wife of Dutch-born American astronomer Bart Bok || 
|-id=138
| 2138 Swissair || 1968 HB || Swissair, was the Swiss national airline || 
|-id=139
| 2139 Makharadze || 1970 MC || The Georgian city of Ozurgeti (formerly known as Makharadze) is the twin city of Henichesk, Ukraine. It was named to honor the friendship between the two nations || 
|-id=140
| 2140 Kemerovo || 1970 PE || Kemerovo Oblast, district in southwestern Siberia, Russia || 
|-id=141
| 2141 Simferopol ||  || Simferopol, city on the Crimean peninsula || 
|-id=142
| 2142 Landau || 1972 GA || Lev Davidovich Landau (1908–1968), Soviet physicist || 
|-id=143
| 2143 Jimarnold || 1973 SA || James R. Arnold (1923–2012), professor of chemistry at the University of California at San Diego || 
|-id=144
| 2144 Marietta ||  || Marietta Shaginyan (1888–1982), Soviet writer || 
|-id=145
| 2145 Blaauw || 1976 UF || Adriaan Blaauw (1914–2010), Dutch astronomer at Leiden Observatory, director of ESO and president of the IAU || 
|-id=146
| 2146 Stentor || 1976 UQ || Stentor, Greek warrior || 
|-id=147
| 2147 Kharadze || 1976 US || Evgeni Kharadze (1907–2001), Georgian astronomer and director of the Abastumani Observatory and vice-president of the IAU from 1976 to 1982 || 
|-id=148
| 2148 Epeios || 1976 UW || Epeios, Greek soldier and builder of Trojan Horse || 
|-id=149
| 2149 Schwambraniya || 1977 FX || Fictional land from Lev Kassil's Conduite and Schwambraniya || 
|-id=150
| 2150 Nyctimene || 1977 TA || Nyctimene, a daughter of Epopeus, King of Lesbos || 
|-id=151
| 2151 Hadwiger || 1977 VX || Hugo Hadwiger (1908–1981), Swiss mathematician || 
|-id=152
| 2152 Hannibal || 1978 WK || Hannibal (c. 247–182 BC) || 
|-id=153
| 2153 Akiyama || 1978 XD || Kaoru Akiyama (1901–1970), Japanese astronomer || 
|-id=154
| 2154 Underhill || 2015 P-L || Anne B. Underhill, Canadian astrophysicist || 
|-id=155
| 2155 Wodan || 6542 P-L || Odin ("Wōdan" in Old Saxon), Norse god in Teutonic mythology || 
|-id=156
| 2156 Kate || A917 SH || Kate, wife of astronomer L. K. Kristensen, who found the identification of this minor planet || 
|-id=157
| 2157 Ashbrook || A924 EF || Joseph Ashbrook (1918–1980), editor of Sky & Telescope || 
|-id=158
| 2158 Tietjen || 1933 OS || Friedrich Tietjen (1832–1895), German astronomer || 
|-id=159
| 2159 Kukkamäki || 1941 UX || Tauno Kukkamäki (1909–1997), Finnish geodesist || 
|-id=160
| 2160 Spitzer || 1956 RL || Lyman Spitzer (1914–1997), American astrophysicist || 
|-id=161
| 2161 Grissom || 1963 UD || Gus Grissom (1926–1967), American astronaut || 
|-id=162
| 2162 Anhui || 1966 BE || Anhui, province in East China || 
|-id=163
| 2163 Korczak ||  || Janusz Korczak (1878–1942), Polish writer who was murdered at Treblinka || 
|-id=164
| 2164 Lyalya ||  || Yelena Konstantinova Ubiivovk (1918–1942), astronomy student and Soviet partisan who died in World War II || 
|-id=165
| 2165 Young || 1956 RJ || Charles Augustus Young (1834–1908), American astronomer || 
|-id=166
| 2166 Handahl || 1936 QB || Violet Handahl Green, mother of astronomer Daniel W. E. Green, who found the identifications for this planet || 
|-id=167
| 2167 Erin || 1971 LA || Erin, daughter of astronomer George Punko at Bickley–Perth Observatory || 
|-id=168
| 2168 Swope ||  || Henrietta Hill Swope (1902–1980), American astronomer || 
|-id=169
| 2169 Taiwan ||  || Named for the Island of Taiwan (also see Taiwan) || 
|-id=170
| 2170 Byelorussia || 1971 SZ || Republic of Belarus, a former Soviet Socialist Republic || 
|-id=171
| 2171 Kiev ||  || City of Kiev, capital of Ukraine, named on its 1500th anniversary || 
|-id=172
| 2172 Plavsk ||  || Plavsk, district in Russia || 
|-id=173
| 2173 Maresjev ||  || Alexei Maresiev (1916–2001), Russian war veteran || 
|-id=174
| 2174 Asmodeus || 1975 TA || Asmodai, Babylonian god of lust || 
|-id=175
| 2175 Andrea Doria || 1977 TY || Andrea Doria (1466–1560), Genoese admiral || 
|-id=176
| 2176 Donar || 2529 P-L || Donar or Thor, Teutonic god of thunderstorms || 
|-id=177
| 2177 Oliver || 6551 P-L || Bernard M. Oliver (1916–1995), researcher at Hewlett-Packard || 
|-id=178
| 2178 Kazakhstania ||  || The Republic of Kazakhstan, a former Soviet Socialist Republic || 
|-id=179
| 2179 Platzeck || 1965 MA || Ricardo Pablo Platzeck, Argentinian astronomer and director of the Cordoba Observatory || 
|-id=180
| 2180 Marjaleena || 1940 RJ || Finnish Marjaleena Johnsson, daughter of the discoverer Heikki A. Alikoski || 
|-id=181
| 2181 Fogelin || 1942 YA || Eric S. Fogelin, assistant at the Minor Planet Center || 
|-id=182
| 2182 Semirot ||  || Pierre Sémirot (1907–1972), French astronomer || 
|-id=183
| 2183 Neufang || 1959 OB || Neufang, village in Thuringia, Germany, where the Sonneberg Observatory is located || 
|-id=184
| 2184 Fujian ||  || Fujian, coastal province in southeastern China || 
|-id=185
| 2185 Guangdong || 1965 WO || Guangdong, coastal province in southern China || 
|-id=186
| 2186 Keldysh ||  || Mstislav Keldysh (1911–1978), Soviet physicist and mathematician || 
|-id=187
| 2187 La Silla || 1976 UH || Mountain in the Atacama desert of Chile, where the La Silla Observatory is located || 
|-id=188
| 2188 Orlenok ||  || Orlyonok All-Union Young Pioneer camp || 
|-id=189
| 2189 Zaragoza || 1975 QK || Aldo Zaragoza (1924–1979) staff member at Felix Aguilar Observatory || 
|-id=190
| 2190 Coubertin ||  || Baron Pierre de Coubertin (1863–1937), French educator and founder of the modern Olympic Games || 
|-id=191
| 2191 Uppsala ||  || Uppsala, ancient Swedish city and its university || 
|-id=192
| 2192 Pyatigoriya || 1972 HP || Pyatigorsk, Russian city in the Caucasus || 
|-id=193
| 2193 Jackson || 1926 KB || Cyril V. Jackson (1903–1988), South African astronomer || 
|-id=194
| 2194 Arpola || 1940 GE || Discoverer's summer cottage near Turku || 
|-id=195
| 2195 Tengström ||  || Erik Tengström (1913–1996), Swedish astronomer and geodesist || 
|-id=196
| 2196 Ellicott || 1965 BC || Andrew Ellicott Douglass (1867–1962), American astronomer || 
|-id=197
| 2197 Shanghai || 1965 YN || Shanghai, largest city in China (and the world) || 
|-id=198
| 2198 Ceplecha || 1975 VF || Zdeněk Ceplecha (1929–2009), Czech astronomer || 
|-id=199
| 2199 Kleť || 1978 LA || Kleť Observatory, standing on Kleť Hill, Czech Republic || 
|-id=200
| 2200 Pasadena || 6090 P-L || Pasadena, California, suburb of Los Angeles, California, United States || 
|}

2201–2300 

|-
| 2201 Oljato || 1947 XC || Moonlight Water, Monument Valley, Utah || 
|-id=202
| 2202 Pele || 1972 RA || Pele, Polynesian fire goddess || 
|-id=203
| 2203 van Rhijn ||  || Pieter Johannes van Rhijn (1886–1960), Dutch astronomer || 
|-id=204
| 2204 Lyyli || 1943 EQ || Lyyli Heinänen, Finnish astronomer and disciple of Yrjö Väisälä || 
|-id=205
| 2205 Glinka ||  || Mikhail Glinka (1804–1857), Russian composer || 
|-id=206
| 2206 Gabrova ||  || Gabrovo, Bulgarian town || 
|-id=207
| 2207 Antenor ||  || Antenor, Trojan hero and sage of Greek mythology || 
|-id=208
| 2208 Pushkin ||  || Aleksandr Pushkin, Russian poet || 
|-id=209
| 2209 Tianjin ||  || Tianjin, China || 
|-id=210
| 2210 Lois || 9597 P-L || Lois J. Baldwin, wife of Ralph Belknap Baldwin, American astronomer || 
|-id=211
| 2211 Hanuman ||  || Hanuman, monkey-god in mythology of India || 
|-id=212
| 2212 Hephaistos || 1978 SB || Hephaestus, Greek god || 
|-id=213
| 2213 Meeus ||  || Jean Meeus (born 1928), Belgian amateur astronomer || 
|-id=214
| 2214 Carol || 1953 GF || Carol D. Valenti, Minor Planet Center staff member || 
|-id=215
| 2215 Sichuan ||  || Sichuan, China || 
|-id=216
| 2216 Kerch || 1971 LF || Hero City Kerch, Crimea || 
|-id=217
| 2217 Eltigen ||  || a place where Soviet troops landed in November 1943 (see Kerch-Eltigen Operation) || 
|-id=218
| 2218 Wotho || 1975 AK || Wotho Atoll, Marshall Islands || 
|-id=219
| 2219 Mannucci || 1975 LU || Edgardo Mannucci, observatory mechanic || 
|-id=220
| 2220 Hicks || 1975 VB || William B. Hicks, businessman || 
|-id=221
| 2221 Chilton || 1976 QC || Jean Chilton McCrosky, wife of Richard Eugene McCrosky, American astronomer || 
|-id=222
| 2222 Lermontov ||  || Mikhail Lermontov, Russian poet || 
|-id=223
| 2223 Sarpedon ||  || Sarpedon, Greek warrior || 
|-id=224
| 2224 Tucson || 2528 P-L || Tucson, Arizona, USA || 
|-id=225
| 2225 Serkowski || 6546 P-L || Krzysztof Serkowski (1930–1981), Polish-born American astronomer || 
|-id=226
| 2226 Cunitza ||  || Lydia Cunitz, discoverer's sister-in-law || 
|-id=227
| 2227 Otto Struve || 1955 RX || Otto Struve (1897–1963), Russian-born American astronomer || 
|-id=228
| 2228 Soyuz-Apollo || 1977 OH || The Apollo-Soyuz Test Project joint Soviet-American mission || 
|-id=229
| 2229 Mezzarco || 1977 RO || Italian for half-arch, half-vault || 
|-id=230
| 2230 Yunnan ||  || Yunnan, China || 
|-id=231
| 2231 Durrell || 1941 SG || Lawrence Durrell (1912–1990), British author || 
|-id=232
| 2232 Altaj ||  || Altai Republic, Russia || 
|-id=233
| 2233 Kuznetsov ||  || Nikolai Kuznetsov, Soviet partisan and intelligence agent || 
|-id=234
| 2234 Schmadel || 1977 HD || Lutz D. Schmadel (1942–2016), German astronomer || 
|-id=235
| 2235 Vittore || A924 GA || Observatory in Bologna, Italy || 
|-id=236
| 2236 Austrasia || 1933 FX || Austrasia, kingdom of the Merovingian Franks || 
|-id=237
| 2237 Melnikov || 1938 TB || Oleg Melnikov (1912–1982), Russian astronomer || 
|-id=238
| 2238 Steshenko ||  || Nikolai Steshenko, Soviet astronomer || 
|-id=239
| 2239 Paracelsus || 1978 RC || Paracelsus, physician || 
|-id=240
| 2240 Tsai || 1978 YA || Tsai Chang-hsien, Chinese astronomer || 
|-id=241
| 2241 Alcathous || 1979 WM || Alcathous, mythological Greek || 
|-id=242
| 2242 Balaton || 1936 TG || Lake Balaton, largest lake in Hungary || 
|-id=243
| 2243 Lönnrot ||  || Elias Lönnrot (1802–1884), Finnish scholar, collector of folk tales and traditions || 
|-id=244
| 2244 Tesla ||  || Nikola Tesla (1856–1943), Serbian-born electrical engineer and inventor || 
|-id=245
| 2245 Hekatostos || 1968 BC || Greek for 100th (asteroid discovered by a joint program) || 
|-id=246
| 2246 Bowell || 1979 XH || Edward L. G. Bowell (born 1943), American astronomer and discoverer of minor planets || 
|-id=247
| 2247 Hiroshima || 6512 P-L || Hiroshima, Japan || 
|-id=248
| 2248 Kanda || 1933 DE || Shigeru Kanda (1894–1974), Japanese science writer || 
|-id=249
| 2249 Yamamoto || 1942 GA || Issei Yamamoto (1889–1959), Japanese astronomer || 
|-id=250
| 2250 Stalingrad || 1972 HN || now Volgograd, Russia || 
|-id=251
| 2251 Tikhov ||  || Gavriil Adrianovich Tikhov (1875–1960), Russian astronomer || 
|-id=252
| 2252 CERGA || 1978 VT || CERGA  || 
|-id=253
| 2253 Espinette || 1932 PB || house in Williams Bay, Wisconsin || 
|-id=254
| 2254 Requiem ||  || in memory of discoverer's mother || 
|-id=255
| 2255 Qinghai ||  || Qinghai, China || 
|-id=256
| 2256 Wiśniewski || 4519 P-L || Wiesław Z. Wiśniewski (1931–1994), Polish astronomer || 
|-id=257
| 2257 Kaarina || 1939 QB || Kaarina Soini, daughter of discoverer || 
|-id=258
| 2258 Viipuri || 1939 TA || now Vyborg, Russia || 
|-id=259
| 2259 Sofievka || 1971 OG || park in Uman, Ukraine || 
|-id=260
| 2260 Neoptolemus ||  || Neoptolemus, mythological Greek warrior || 
|-id=261
| 2261 Keeler || 1977 HC || James Edward Keeler (1857–1900), American astronomer || 
|-id=262
| 2262 Mitidika || 1978 RB || Gypsy girl from novel by Clemens Brentano || 
|-id=263
| 2263 Shaanxi ||  || Shaanxi, China || 
|-id=264
| 2264 Sabrina || 1979 YK || Sabrina, the legendary English princess and daughter of King Locrine, who drowned in the River Severn || 
|-id=265
| 2265 Verbaandert || 1950 DB || Jean Verbaandert (1901–1974), Belgian geophysicist || 
|-id=266
| 2266 Tchaikovsky || 1974 VK || Pyotr Ilyich Tchaikovsky (1840–1893), Russian composer || 
|-id=267
| 2267 Agassiz || 1977 RF || Louis Agassiz (1807–1873), Swiss-born American zoologist and geologist || 
|-id=268
| 2268 Szmytowna || 1942 VW || Maria Szmytowna, chemist || 
|-id=269
| 2269 Efremiana ||  || Ivan Yefremov (1908–1972), Soviet paleontologist and author || 
|-id=270
| 2270 Yazhi || 1980 ED || Navajo for little one || 
|-id=271
| 2271 Kiso ||  || Kiso Observatory, a station of the Tokyo Observatory || 
|-id=272
| 2272 Montezuma || 1972 FA || Moctezuma II, 9th emperor of the Aztec empire || 
|-id=273
| 2273 Yarilo ||  || Iarilo, Slavic sun god || 
|-id=274
| 2274 Ehrsson || 1976 EA || A friend of discoverer Claes-Ingvar Lagerkvist || 
|-id=275
| 2275 Cuitlahuac || 1979 MH || Cuitláhuac, tenth emperor of the Aztec empire || 
|-id=276
| 2276 Warck || 1933 QA || Evelyne Warck, granddaughter of discoverer || 
|-id=277
| 2277 Moreau || 1950 DS || Fernand Moreau (1888–1979), Belgian astronomer || 
|-id=278
| 2278 Götz || 1953 GE || Paul Götz (1883–1962), German astronomer and discoverer of minor planets. Assistant to Max Wolf at Heidelberg. || 
|-id=279
| 2279 Barto || 1968 DL || Agniya Barto (1906–1981), Soviet poet || 
|-id=280
| 2280 Kunikov ||  || Tsaezar Kunikov (1909–1943), Soviet war hero, commander, whose army seized Malaya Zemlya in 1943 || 
|-id=281
| 2281 Biela ||  || Wilhelm von Biela (1782–1856), Austrian astronomer || 
|-id=282
| 2282 Andrés Bello || 1974 FE || Andrés Bello (1781–1865), Venezuelan intellectual || 
|-id=283
| 2283 Bunke ||  || Tamara Bunke (1937–1967), German patriot || 
|-id=284
| 2284 San Juan ||  || San Juan Province and its university in Argentina || 
|-id=285
| 2285 Ron Helin || 1976 QB || Ronald P. Helin, husband of Eleanor F. Helin, American astronomer || 
|-id=286
| 2286 Fesenkov || 1977 NH || Vasily Fesenkov (1889–1972), Soviet astrophysicist || 
|-id=287
| 2287 Kalmykia ||  || Kalmyk ASSR, Russian SFSR, now Kalmykia, Russia || 
|-id=288
| 2288 Karolinum || 1979 UZ || The Collegium Carolinum, the main building of the Charles University in Prague || 
|-id=289
| 2289 McMillan || 6567 P-L || Robert S. McMillan, American astronomer || 
|-id=290
| 2290 Helffrich ||  || Joseph Helffrich (1890–1971), German astronomer and discoverer of minor planets || 
|-id=291
| 2291 Kevo || 1941 FS || Field station on the Kevo river, Lappland || 
|-id=292
| 2292 Seili || 1942 RM || Seili, island near Turku || 
|-id=293
| 2293 Guernica ||  || Guernica, Spain || 
|-id=294
| 2294 Andronikov ||  || Irakly Andronikov (1908–1990), Soviet writer || 
|-id=295
| 2295 Matusovskij ||  || Mikhail Matusovskii (1915–1990), Soviet poet || 
|-id=296
| 2296 Kugultinov ||  || David Nikitich Kugultinov (1922–2006), poet of Kalmykia and USSR || 
|-id=297
| 2297 Daghestan || 1978 RE || Dagestan ASSR, Russian SFSR (now Daghestan, Russia) || 
|-id=298
| 2298 Cindijon || A915 TA || Cynthia and Jonathan, children of Brian G. Marsden || 
|-id=299
| 2299 Hanko || 1941 SZ || Hanko, Finland || 
|-id=300
| 2300 Stebbins ||  || Joel Stebbins (1878–1966), American astronomer || 
|}

2301–2400 

|-
| 2301 Whitford || 1965 WJ || Albert Whitford (1905–2002), American astronomer || 
|-id=302
| 2302 Florya ||  || Nikolay Florea (1912–1941), Russian astronomer at Sternberg Astronomical Institute || 
|-id=303
| 2303 Retsina || 1979 FK || Retsina, Greek wine || 
|-id=304
| 2304 Slavia || 1979 KB || Slavia, sports club in Prague || 
|-id=305
| 2305 King ||  || Martin Luther King Jr. (1929–1968), U.S. civil rights leader || 
|-id=306
| 2306 Bauschinger || 1939 PM || Julius Bauschinger (1860–1934), German astronomer || 
|-id=307
| 2307 Garuda || 1957 HJ || Garuda is a son of Kasyapa and Vinata in the mythology of India || 
|-id=308
| 2308 Schilt || 1967 JM || Jan Schilt (1894–1982), Dutch astronomer || 
|-id=309
| 2309 Mr. Spock ||  || Discoverer's cat, "Mr. Spock", named after Spock, a fictional character from Star Trek || 
|-id=310
| 2310 Olshaniya ||  || Konstantin Olshanskij, a Soviet war hero who entered Nazi-occupied Nikolaev in March 1944 || 
|-id=311
| 2311 El Leoncito ||  || Observing station at Félix Aguilar Observatory || 
|-id=312
| 2312 Duboshin ||  || Georgii Nikolaevich Duboshin (1904–1986), Soviet astronomer and member of the IAU || 
|-id=313
| 2313 Aruna || 1976 TA || Represents the red glow of dawn in mythology of India || 
|-id=314
| 2314 Field || 1977 VD || George B. Field (born 1929), American astronomer || 
|-id=315
| 2315 Czechoslovakia || 1980 DZ || Czechoslovakia, which split into the Czech Republic and Slovakia in 1993 || 
|-id=316
| 2316 Jo-Ann || 1980 RH || Jo-Ann Bowell, wife of discoverer || 
|-id=317
| 2317 Galya || 2524 P-L || Galya Lubarsky, friend of Tom Gehrels || 
|-id=318
| 2318 Lubarsky || 6521 P-L || Kronid Lyubarsky (1934–1996), friend of Tom Gehrels || 
|-id=319
| 2319 Aristides || 7631 P-L || Aristides (530–468 BC), Athenian politician || 
|-id=320
| 2320 Blarney || 1979 QJ || Blarney, Ireland || 
|-id=321
| 2321 Lužnice ||  || Lužnice River, Czech Republic || 
|-id=322
| 2322 Kitt Peak ||  || Kitt Peak National Observatory, USA || 
|-id=323
| 2323 Zverev ||  || Mitrofan Stepanovich Zverev (1903–1991), Russian astrometrist at Pulkovo Observatory || 
|-id=324
| 2324 Janice ||  || Janice Cline, astronomy supporter || 
|-id=325
| 2325 Chernykh || 1979 SP || Lyudmila (1935–2017) and Nikolai Chernykh (1931–2004), Russian astronomers and minor-planet discoverers || 
|-id=326
| 2326 Tololo || 1965 QC || Cerro Tololo Inter-American Observatory, Chile || 
|-id=327
| 2327 Gershberg ||  || Roald Evgenevich Gershberg, Russian astronomer || 
|-id=328
| 2328 Robeson || 1972 HW || Paul Robeson (1898–1976), American singer, actor and activist || 
|-id=329
| 2329 Orthos || 1976 WA || Orthrus (Orthos), the two-headed dog from Greek mythology || 
|-id=330
| 2330 Ontake ||  || Mount Ontake, volcano || 
|-id=331
| 2331 Parvulesco || 1936 EA || Constantin Parvulesco (1890–1945), Romanian astronomer || 
|-id=332
| 2332 Kalm || 1940 GH || Pehr Kalm (1716–1779), Finnish explorer, botanist, agricultural economist || 
|-id=333
| 2333 Porthan || 1943 EP || Henrik Gabriel Porthan (1739–1804), Finnish historian || 
|-id=334
| 2334 Cuffey || 1962 HD || James Cuffey (1911–1999), astronomy supporter || 
|-id=335
| 2335 James || 1974 UB || James G. Williams, American mathematician and a discoverer of minor planets || 
|-id=336
| 2336 Xinjiang ||  || Xinjiang, China || 
|-id=337
| 2337 Boubín ||  || Boubín, mountain in Bohemia, Czech Republic || 
|-id=338
| 2338 Bokhan ||  || Nadezhda Antonovna Bokhan, staff member at Institute of Theoretical Astronomy (ITA) in Leningrad || 
|-id=339
| 2339 Anacreon || 2509 P-L || Anacreon (c. 582–485 BC), Greek poet || 
|-id=340
| 2340 Hathor || 1976 UA || Hathor, Egyptian goddess || 
|-id=341
| 2341 Aoluta ||  || Astronomical Observatory of Leningrad University || 
|-id=342
| 2342 Lebedev || 1968 UQ || , Russian war hero || 
|-id=343
| 2343 Siding Spring ||  || Siding Spring Observatory, Australia || 
|-id=344
| 2344 Xizang ||  || Tibet || 
|-id=345
| 2345 Fučik || 1974 OS || Julius Fučik (1903–1943), Czechoslovak journalist || 
|-id=346
| 2346 Lilio || 1934 CB || Aloysius Lilius (c. 1510–1576), inventor of the Gregorian Calendar || 
|-id=347
| 2347 Vinata || 1936 TK || Vinata, in mythology of India, daughter of Prajapati and wife of Kasyapa || 
|-id=348
| 2348 Michkovitch || 1939 AA || Vojislav V. Michkovitch (1892–1976), Serbian astronomer || 
|-id=349
| 2349 Kurchenko || 1970 OG || Nadezhda Kurchenko, heroic airline stewardess || 
|-id=350
| 2350 von Lüde || 1938 CG || Heinz von Lüde (1914–1974), German ARI-astronomer || 
|-id=351
| 2351 O'Higgins || 1964 VD || Bernardo O'Higgins (1778–1842), Chilean hero || 
|-id=352
| 2352 Kurchatov || 1969 RY || Igor Kurchatov (1903–1960), Russian physicist || 
|-id=353
| 2353 Alva || 1975 UD || former girlfriend of discoverer || 
|-id=354
| 2354 Lavrov ||  || Svyatoslav Sergeevich Lavrov (born 1923), Russian computer scientist || 
|-id=355
| 2355 Nei Monggol ||  || Inner Mongolia, China || 
|-id=356
| 2356 Hirons || 1979 UJ || Charles and Ann Hirons, parents-in-law of discoverer || 
|-id=357
| 2357 Phereclos || 1981 AC || Phereclos, Trojan craftsman || 
|-id=358
| 2358 Bahner || 1929 RE || Klaus Bahner (1921–), German staff member at Heidelberg Observatory || 
|-id=359
| 2359 Debehogne || 1931 TV || Henri Debehogne (1928–2007), Belgian astronomer and discoverer of minor planets || 
|-id=360
| 2360 Volgo-Don ||  || Volga–Don Canal, a canal that connects the Volga River and the Don River in Russia || 
|-id=361
| 2361 Gogol ||  || Nikolai Gogol (1809–1852), Russian-Ukrainian writer || 
|-id=362
| 2362 Mark Twain ||  || Mark Twain (1835–1910), American writer || 
|-id=363
| 2363 Cebriones ||  || Cebriones, Hector's charioteer || 
|-id=364
| 2364 Seillier || 1978 GD || Mother of discoverer || 
|-id=365
| 2365 Interkosmos || 1980 YQ || Intercosmos, Russian space exploration organization || 
|-id=366
| 2366 Aaryn ||  || Aaryn G. Baltutis, grandson of discoverer || 
|-id=367
| 2367 Praha ||  || Prague, the capital city of the Czech Republic || 
|-id=368
| 2368 Beltrovata || 1977 RA || Betty Tendering, friend of Swiss poet Gottfried Keller (1819–1890) || 
|-id=369
| 2369 Chekhov ||  || Anton Chekhov (1860–1904), Russian writer || 
|-id=370
| 2370 van Altena || 1965 LA || William F. van Altena, Dutch-born American astronomer and astrometrist at the Yale University Observatory || 
|-id=371
| 2371 Dimitrov ||  || Georgi Dimitrov (1882–1949), Bulgarian politician || 
|-id=372
| 2372 Proskurin ||  || Vitalij Fedorovich Proskurin (1919–1964), Russian astronomer || 
|-id=373
| 2373 Immo || 1929 PC || Immo Appenzeller (born 1940), German astronomer and director of the Heidelberg Observatory || 
|-id=374
| 2374 Vladvysotskij ||  || Vladimir Vysotsky (1938–1980), Russian singer || 
|-id=375
| 2375 Radek || 1975 AA || Ctirad Kohoutek (1929–2011), Czech composer || 
|-id=376
| 2376 Martynov ||  || Dmitrij Yakovlevich Martynov, Russian astrophysicist and director of the Sternberg Astronomical Institute || 
|-id=377
| 2377 Shcheglov ||  || Vladimir Petrovich Shcheglov, Russian astronomer and director of the Astronomical Institute of the Uzbek || 
|-id=378
| 2378 Pannekoek || 1935 CY || Antonie Pannekoek (1873–1960), Dutch astronomer || 
|-id=379
| 2379 Heiskanen || 1941 ST || Veikko Aleksanteri Heiskanen (1895–1971), Finnish geodesist || 
|-id=380
| 2380 Heilongjiang || 1965 SN || Heilongjiang, China || 
|-id=381
| 2381 Landi || 1976 AF || Jorge Landi Dessy, Argentinian astronomer and a director of the Cordoba Observatory || 
|-id=382
| 2382 Nonie || 1977 GA || Daughter of Peter Jekabsons, observatory staff || 
|-id=383
| 2383 Bradley || 1981 GN || Martin and Maud Bradley, friends of discoverer || 
|-id=384
| 2384 Schulhof ||  || Lipót Schulhof (1847–1921), Hungarian-born astronomer and a discoverer of minor planets || 
|-id=385
| 2385 Mustel || 1969 VW || Evald Rudolfovich Mustel (1911–1988), Russian astronomer || 
|-id=386
| 2386 Nikonov ||  || Vladimir Borisovich Nikonov (1905–1987), Soviet astronomer at the Crimean Astrophysical Observatory || 
|-id=387
| 2387 Xi'an || 1975 FX || Xi'an, China || 
|-id=388
| 2388 Gase ||  || Vera Fedorovna Gaze (1899–1954), Russian astronomer at the Pulkovo Observatory || 
|-id=389
| 2389 Dibaj ||  || Ernest Apushevich Dibaj (1931–1983), Russian astrophysicist || 
|-id=390
| 2390 Nežárka ||  || Nežárka River, Czech Republic || 
|-id=391
| 2391 Tomita || 1957 AA || Kōichirō Tomita (1925–2006), Japanese astronomer and a discoverer of minor planets || 
|-id=392
| 2392 Jonathan Murray ||  || Jonathan Murray, son of Suzanne and Bruce C. Murray, friends of discoverers || 
|-id=393
| 2393 Suzuki || 1955 WB || Keishin Suzuki (1905–), Japanese astronomer and professor of astronomy at Tokyo Gakugei University || 
|-id=394
| 2394 Nadeev ||  || Lev Nikolaevich Nadeev (1902–1974), Russian astrometrist and geodesist || 
|-id=395
| 2395 Aho || 1977 FA || Arne J. Aho, a staff member at the Harvard Observatory || 
|-id=396
| 2396 Kochi || 1981 CB || Kōchi, Japan || 
|-id=397
| 2397 Lappajärvi || 1938 DV || Lappajärvi, lake in Finland || 
|-id=398
| 2398 Jilin ||  || Jilin, China || 
|-id=399
| 2399 Terradas || 1971 MA || Esteban Terradas i Illa (1883–1950), Spanish mathematician || 
|-id=400
| 2400 Derevskaya || 1972 KJ || Alexandra Avramovna Derevskaya (1902–1959), a celebrated Russian foster mother who raised 48 orphans of different nationalities || 
|}

2401–2500 

|-
| 2401 Aehlita ||  || Aehlita, fictional character from a novel by Aleksei Nikolaevich Tolstoi || 
|-id=402
| 2402 Satpaev ||  || Kanysh Satbayev (1899–1964), Kazakh geologist || 
|-id=403
| 2403 Šumava || 1979 SQ || Šumava mountains, Czech Republic || 
|-id=404
| 2404 Antarctica || 1980 TE || Antarctica, in honour of the third Soviet Antarctic Expedition, in which the discoverer participated || 
|-id=405
| 2405 Welch || 1963 UF || David Welch (born 1960), AURA administrator || 
|-id=406
| 2406 Orelskaya || 1966 QG || Varvara Ivanovna Orel'skaya, Russian long-time staff member at the Institute for Theoretical Astronomy (ITA) in St. Petersburg || 
|-id=407
| 2407 Haug || 1973 DH || Ulrich Haug (1929–1992), German astronomer || 
|-id=408
| 2408 Astapovich ||  || Igor' Stanislavovich Astapovich  (1908–1976), Russian meteoricist and professor at Kiev University || 
|-id=409
| 2409 Chapman || 1979 UG || Clark R. Chapman, American astronomer || 
|-id=410
| 2410 Morrison || 1981 AF || David Morrison (born 1940), American astronomer || 
|-id=411
| 2411 Zellner || 1981 JK || Benjamin H. Zellner, American astronomer at the University of Arizona || 
|-id=412
| 2412 Wil || 3537 P-L || Wil van de Hulst, wife of Dutch astronomer Hendrik C. van de Hulst || 
|-id=413
| 2413 van de Hulst || 6816 P-L || Hendrik C. van de Hulst (1918–2000), Dutch astronomer || 
|-id=414
| 2414 Vibeke || 1931 UG || Vibeke Kristensen, daughter of L. K. Kristensen who made the identifications for this asteroid || 
|-id=415
| 2415 Ganesa || 1978 UJ || In mythology of India, represents call to spiritual power || 
|-id=416
| 2416 Sharonov ||  || Vsevolod Vasil'evich Sharonov (1901–1964), Russian observatory director || 
|-id=417
| 2417 McVittie || 1964 CD || George C. McVittie (1904–1988), American astronomer || 
|-id=418
| 2418 Voskovec-Werich || 1971 UV || George Voskovec (1905–1981) and Jan Werich (1905–1980), Czech actors || 
|-id=419
| 2419 Moldavia || 1974 SJ || Moldavian Soviet Socialist Republic || 
|-id=420
| 2420 Čiurlionis || 1975 TN || Mikalojus Konstantinas Čiurlionis (1875–1911), Lithuanian painter and composer || 
|-id=421
| 2421 Nininger || 1979 UD || Harvey H. Nininger (1887–1986), American meteoriticist || 
|-id=422
| 2422 Perovskaya ||  || Sophia Perovskaya (1853–1881), Russian revolutionary || 
|-id=423
| 2423 Ibarruri || 1972 NC || Rubén Ruiz Ibárruri (1920–1942), Russian soldier || 
|-id=424
| 2424 Tautenburg ||  || Tautenburg, Germany || 
|-id=425
| 2425 Shenzhen || 1975 FW || Shenzhen, China || 
|-id=426
| 2426 Simonov || 1976 KV || Konstantin Mikhailovich Simonov (1915–1979), Russian writer || 
|-id=427
| 2427 Kobzar ||  || Taras Shevchenko (penname: Kobzar, 1814–1861), Ukrainian poet and painter || 
|-id=428
| 2428 Kamenyar ||  || Ivan Franko (a.k.a. Kamenyar; 1856–1916), Ukrainian writer and scientist || 
|-id=429
| 2429 Schürer || 1977 TZ || Max Schürer (1910–1997), Swiss astronomer geodestist and mathematician, who initiated the construction of the Zimmerwald Observatory during his term as director of the Astronomical Institute of the University of Bern Src || 
|-id=430
| 2430 Bruce Helin || 1977 VC || Bruce Helin, son of one of the discoverers || 
|-id=431
| 2431 Skovoroda ||  || Gregory Skovoroda (1722–1794), Ukrainian philosopher and poet || 
|-id=432
| 2432 Soomana || 1981 FA || Hopi for star girl || 
|-id=433
| 2433 Sootiyo || 1981 GJ || Hopi for star boy || 
|-id=434
| 2434 Bateson || 1981 KA || Frank Bateson (1909–2007), New Zealand astronomer || 
|-id=435
| 2435 Horemheb || 4578 P-L || Horemheb, Egyptian pharaoh || 
|-id=436
| 2436 Hatshepsut || 6066 P-L || Hatshepsut, Egyptian queen || 
|-id=437
| 2437 Amnestia || 1942 RZ || Amnesty International || 
|-id=438
| 2438 Oleshko ||  || Valentina Iosifovna Oleshko (1924–1943), Russian partisan || 
|-id=439
| 2439 Ulugbek ||  || Ulugh Beg, Uzbek sultan and astronomer || 
|-id=440
| 2440 Educatio ||  || Education || 
|-id=441
| 2441 Hibbs ||  || Marka and Albert Hibbs, friends of one discoverer || 
|-id=442
| 2442 Corbett || 1980 TO || Jim Corbett (1875–1955), hunter and writer || 
|-id=443
| 2443 Tomeileen || A906 BJ || Thomas and Eileen Marsden, parents of Brian G. Marsden || 
|-id=444
| 2444 Lederle || 1934 CD || Trudpert Lederle (1922–2002), German astronomer || 
|-id=445
| 2445 Blazhko || 1935 TC || Sergey Blazhko (1870–1956), Russian astronomer || 
|-id=446
| 2446 Lunacharsky ||  || Anatoly Lunacharsky (1875–1933), Russian statesman and writer || 
|-id=447
| 2447 Kronstadt ||  || Kronstadt, Russia || 
|-id=448
| 2448 Sholokhov || 1975 BU || Mikhail Sholokhov (1905–1984), Russian writer || 
|-id=449
| 2449 Kenos || 1978 GC || First man in mythology of Native Americans of Tierra del Fuego || 
|-id=450
| 2450 Ioannisiani || 1978 RP || Bagrat Konstantinovich Ioannisiani (1911–1985), Russian telescope designer || 
|-id=451
| 2451 Dollfus || 1980 RQ || Audouin Dollfus (1924–2010), French astronomer || 
|-id=452
| 2452 Lyot || 1981 FE || Bernard Lyot (1897–1952), French astronomer || 
|-id=453
| 2453 Wabash || A921 SA || Bob Warshow (a.k.a. "Wabash"), American computer operator at the Harvard-Smithsonian Center for Astrophysics || 
|-id=454
| 2454 Olaus Magnus || 1941 SS || Olaus Magnus || 
|-id=455
| 2455 Somville ||  || Oscar Somville (1880–1980), Dutch seismologist at Uccle Observatory || 
|-id=456
| 2456 Palamedes ||  || Palamedes, Greek commander || 
|-id=457
| 2457 Rublyov ||  || Andrei Rublev, 14th-century Russian painter || 
|-id=458
| 2458 Veniakaverin ||  || Veniamin Kaverin (1902–1989), Russian writer || 
|-id=459
| 2459 Spellmann ||  || Leonard Spellmann, father of discoverer || 
|-id=460
| 2460 Mitlincoln ||  || MIT and Lincoln Laboratory || 
|-id=461
| 2461 Clavel ||  || Gustavine Clavel, centenarian || 
|-id=462
| 2462 Nehalennia || 6578 P-L || Nehalennia, Roman goddess || 
|-id=463
| 2463 Sterpin || 1934 FF || Julia Sterpin Van Biesbroeck, wife of discoverer || 
|-id=464
| 2464 Nordenskiöld || 1939 BF || Adolf Erik Nordenskiöld (1832–1901), Finnish-born Swedish explorer || 
|-id=465
| 2465 Wilson || 1949 PK || Robert Wilson (1927–2002), British astronomer || 
|-id=466
| 2466 Golson || 1959 RJ || John C. Golson (1927–1984), American staff member at the Kitt Peak National Observatory || 
|-id=467
| 2467 Kollontai || 1966 PJ || Alexandra Kollontai (1872–1952), Russian ambassador || 
|-id=468
| 2468 Repin ||  || Ilya Repin (1844–1930), Russian painter || 
|-id=469
| 2469 Tadjikistan || 1970 HA || Tajikistan || 
|-id=470
| 2470 Agematsu ||  || Agematsu, Japan || 
|-id=471
| 2471 Ultrajectum || 6545 P-L || Latin name for the city of Utrecht || 
|-id=472
| 2472 Bradman || 1973 DG || Donald Bradman (1908–2001), Australian cricketer || 
|-id=473
| 2473 Heyerdahl ||  || Thor Heyerdahl (1914–2002), explorer || 
|-id=474
| 2474 Ruby || 1979 PB || Ruby, the discoverer's dog, which lives at the Kleť Observatory || 
|-id=475
| 2475 Semenov ||  || Pavel Afanes'evich Semenov (1912–1942), Commander of a Russian tank battalion in World War II || 
|-id=476
| 2476 Andersen ||  || Hans Christian Andersen (1805–1875), Danish fabulist || 
|-id=477
| 2477 Biryukov ||  || Nikolaj Zotovich Biryukov (1912–1966), Russian writer || 
|-id=478
| 2478 Tokai || 1981 JC || Tōkai, Japan || 
|-id=479
| 2479 Sodankylä || 1942 CB || Sodankylä, Finland || 
|-id=480
| 2480 Papanov ||  || Anatoli Papanov (1922–1987), Russian actor || 
|-id=481
| 2481 Bürgi || 1977 UQ || Jost Bürgi (1552–1632), Swiss clockmaker and maker of scientific instruments, astronomer, and independent inventor of logarithms || 
|-id=482
| 2482 Perkin || 1980 CO || Richard S. and Gladys T. Perkin of Perkin-Elmer Corp., supporters of astronomy || 
|-id=483
| 2483 Guinevere || 1928 QB || Guinevere, Arthurian queen || 
|-id=484
| 2484 Parenago || 1928 TK || Pavel Petrovich Parenago (1906–1960), Russian astronomer || 
|-id=485
| 2485 Scheffler || 1932 BH || Helmut Scheffler (1928–), German astronomer at Heidelberg Observatory || 
|-id=486
| 2486 Metsähovi || 1939 FY || Metsähovi Observatory || 
|-id=487
| 2487 Juhani || 1940 RL || Juhani Alikoski, son of Finnish discoverer Heikki A. Alikoski || 
|-id=488
| 2488 Bryan || 1952 UT || William Lowe Bryan (1860–1955), university president || 
|-id=489
| 2489 Suvorov || 1975 NY || Alexander Suvorov (1729–1800), Russian general and military scientist || 
|-id=490
| 2490 Bussolini || 1976 AG || Juan A. Bussolini, S.J. (1905–1966), Argentine astronomer || 
|-id=491
| 2491 Tvashtri || 1977 CB || Carpenter in mythology of India || 
|-id=492
| 2492 Kutuzov || 1977 NT || Mikhail Kutuzov (1745–1813), Russian military leader || 
|-id=493
| 2493 Elmer || 1978 XC || Charles Elmer (1872–1954), amateur astronomer || 
|-id=494
| 2494 Inge || 1981 LF || Jay L. Inge, cartographer with the USGS and friend of the discoverer || 
|-id=495
| 2495 Noviomagum || 7071 P-L || Latin name for the city of Nijmegen || 
|-id=496
| 2496 Fernandus ||  || Fernandus Payne (1881–1977), American zoologist || 
|-id=497
| 2497 Kulikovskij ||  || Petr Grigor'evich Kulikovskii (1910–), Russian astronomer || 
|-id=498
| 2498 Tsesevich ||  || Vladimir Platonovich Tsesevich (1907–1983), Russian astronomer and director of the Odessa University Observatory || 
|-id=499
| 2499 Brunk ||  || William E. Brunk (born 1928), American astronomer || 
|-id=500
| 2500 Alascattalo || 1926 GC || Alascattalo, mythical beast of Alaska || 
|}

2501–2600 

|-
| 2501 Lohja || 1942 GD || Lohja, a city in Finland || 
|-id=502
| 2502 Nummela || 1943 EO || Nummela, an municipality in Finland || 
|-id=503
| 2503 Liaoning ||  || Liaoning, a province in northeastern China || 
|-id=504
| 2504 Gaviola || 1967 JO || Enrique Gaviola (1900–1989), Argentinian astrophysicist || 
|-id=505
| 2505 Hebei || 1975 UJ || Hebei, China || 
|-id=506
| 2506 Pirogov ||  || Nikolay Pirogov (1810–1881), Russian surgeon and scientist || 
|-id=507
| 2507 Bobone ||  || Jorge Bobone (1901–1958), Argentinian astronomer || 
|-id=508
| 2508 Alupka ||  || Alupka, Ukraine || 
|-id=509
| 2509 Chukotka || 1977 NG || Chukotka Autonomous Okrug, Russia || 
|-id=510
| 2510 Shandong || 1979 TH || Shandong, China || 
|-id=511
| 2511 Patterson || 1980 LM || Clair Cameron Patterson (1922–1995), American geochemist || 
|-id=512
| 2512 Tavastia || 1940 GG || Tavastia Region, Finland || 
|-id=513
| 2513 Baetslé || 1950 SH || Paul-Louis Baetslé (1909–1983), Belgian professor of astronomy and geodesy at the Royal Military Academy and friend of the discoverer, Sylvain Arend || 
|-id=514
| 2514 Taiyuan ||  || Taiyuan, Shaanxi, China || 
|-id=515
| 2515 Gansu ||  || Gansu, China || 
|-id=516
| 2516 Roman || 1964 VY || Nancy Roman (1925–2018), American astronomer || 
|-id=517
| 2517 Orma || 1968 SB || Italian for trace; anagram of 1257 Móra || 
|-id=518
| 2518 Rutllant || 1974 FG || Federico Rutllant Alcina (1904–1971), Spanish-born director of the national observatory in Chile || 
|-id=519
| 2519 Annagerman ||  || Anna German (1936–1982), Soviet-born Polish singer || 
|-id=520
| 2520 Novorossijsk ||  || Novorossiysk, Russia || 
|-id=521
| 2521 Heidi || 1979 DK || Heidi, book by Johanna Spyri || 
|-id=522
| 2522 Triglav || 1980 PP || Triglav, Slavic god || 
|-id=523
| 2523 Ryba || 1980 PV || Jakub Jan Ryba (1765–1815), Czech composer || 
|-id=524
| 2524 Budovicium ||  || Latin for České Budějovice, Czech Republic || 
|-id=525
| 2525 O'Steen || 1981 VG || Mary Elizabeth O'Steen Skiff, mother of discoverer || 
|-id=526
| 2526 Alisary || 1979 KX || Alice Benedicta Loethman West and Harry Richard West, parents of Danish astronomer Richard Martin West who discovered this minor planet || 
|-id=527
| 2527 Gregory || 1981 RE || Bruce Gregory Thomas, youngest son of discoverer, named after James Gregory, Scottish astronomer || 
|-id=528
| 2528 Mohler ||  || Orren Cuthbert Mohler (1908–1985), American astronomer || 
|-id=529
| 2529 Rockwell Kent ||  || Rockwell Kent (1882–1971), American artist || 
|-id=530
| 2530 Shipka ||  || Shipka Pass, battle site from the Russo-Turkish War || 
|-id=531
| 2531 Cambridge || 1980 LD || Cambridge, England, and Cambridge, Massachusetts || 
|-id=532
| 2532 Sutton ||  || Robert L. Sutton, American geologist with the USGS || 
|-id=533
| 2533 Fechtig || A905 VA || Hugo Fechtig (born 1929), German astrophysicist || 
|-id=534
| 2534 Houzeau || 1931 VD || Jean-Charles Houzeau (1820–1888), Belgian astronomer || 
|-id=535
| 2535 Hämeenlinna || 1939 DH || Hämeenlinna, Finland || 
|-id=536
| 2536 Kozyrev || 1939 PJ || Nikolai Aleksandrovich Kozyrev (1908–1983), Russian astronomer || 
|-id=537
| 2537 Gilmore || 1951 RL || Pamela M. Kilmartin and her husband Alan C. Gilmore (born 1944),  New Zealand astronomers and minor-planet discoverers || 
|-id=538
| 2538 Vanderlinden || 1954 UD || Henri Vanderlinden (1892–1983), Belgian astronomer || 
|-id=539
| 2539 Ningxia ||  || Ningxia, China || 
|-id=540
| 2540 Blok ||  || Alexander Blok (1880–1921), Russian poet || 
|-id=541
| 2541 Edebono || 1973 DE || Edward de Bono (1933–2021), Maltese psychologist and philosopher || 
|-id=542
| 2542 Calpurnia || 1980 CF || Calpurnia, Roman noblewoman and the last wife of Julius Caesar || 
|-id=543
| 2543 Machado || 1980 LJ || Luiz Eduardo da Silva Machado, Brazilian astronomer and director of the Valongo Observatory || 
|-id=544
| 2544 Gubarev || 1980 PS || Aleksei Gubarev (1931–2015), Soviet cosmonaut || 
|-id=545
| 2545 Verbiest || 1933 BB || Ferdinand Verbiest (1623–1688), Belgian missionary and astronomer || 
|-id=546
| 2546 Libitina || 1950 FC || Libitina, Roman goddess of funerals || 
|-id=547
| 2547 Hubei ||  || Hubei, China || 
|-id=548
| 2548 Leloir || 1975 DA || Luis Federico Leloir (1906–1987), Argentinian chemist || 
|-id=549
| 2549 Baker || 1976 UB || James Gilbert Baker (1914–2005), American astronomer || 
|-id=550
| 2550 Houssay ||  || Bernardo Houssay (1887–1971), Argentinian physiologist, winner of the Nobel Prize for Medicine and Physiology in 1947 || 
|-id=551
| 2551 Decabrina ||  || Decembrists, Russian revolutionaries || 
|-id=552
| 2552 Remek || 1978 SP || Vladimír Remek (born 1948), Czech cosmonaut || 
|-id=553
| 2553 Viljev ||  || Mikhail Anatolyevich Vilyev (1893–1919), Russian astronomer || 
|-id=554
| 2554 Skiff || 1980 OB || Brian A. Skiff, American astronomer at Lowell Observatory and a discoverer of minor planets || 
|-id=555
| 2555 Thomas || 1980 OC || Norman G. Thomas (born 1930), former Research assistant at Lowell Observatory and a discoverer of minor planets || 
|-id=556
| 2556 Louise || 1981 CS || Carol Louise Thomas-Baltutis, youngest daughter of discoverer || 
|-id=557
| 2557 Putnam ||  || Roger Putnam (1893–1972) and his son, Michael C. J. Putnam (born 1933), astronomy supporters || 
|-id=558
| 2558 Viv ||  || Vivian Russell Thomas, mother of discoverer || 
|-id=559
| 2559 Svoboda || 1981 UH || Jindřich Svoboda (1884–1941), Czech astronomer || 
|-id=560
| 2560 Siegma || 1932 CW || Siegfried A. Marx (born 1934), German astronomer and director of the Karl Schwarzschild Observatory || 
|-id=561
| 2561 Margolin ||  || Mikhail Vladimirovich Margolin (1906–1975), blind inventor || 
|-id=562
| 2562 Chaliapin ||  || Feodor Chaliapin (1873–1938), Russian singer and actor || 
|-id=563
| 2563 Boyarchuk || 1977 FZ || Alexandr Boyarchuk (1931–2015), Russian astronomer || 
|-id=564
| 2564 Kayala || 1977 QX || Kayala, river in The Tale of Igor's Campaign || 
|-id=565
| 2565 Grögler ||  || Norbert Grögler (1928–1983), mineralogist and planetologist || 
|-id=566
| 2566 Kirghizia ||  || Kyrgyzstan || 
|-id=567
| 2567 Elba || 1979 KA || Elba Aguilera de Pizarro, mother of discoverers || 
|-id=568
| 2568 Maksutov || 1980 GH || Dmitry Dmitrievich Maksutov (1896–1964), Russian optical engineer, inventor of the Maksutov telescope || 
|-id=569
| 2569 Madeline || 1980 MA || Heroine of John Keats' poem, "The Eve of St. Agnes" || 
|-id=570
| 2570 Porphyro || 1980 PG || Hero of John Keats' poem, "The Eve of St. Agnes" || 
|-id=571
| 2571 Geisei || 1981 UC || Geisei, Japan || 
|-id=572
| 2572 Annschnell || 1950 DL || Anneliese Schnell (1941–2015), Austrian astronomer || 
|-id=573
| 2573 Hannu Olavi || 1953 EN || Son of discoverer || 
|-id=574
| 2574 Ladoga || 1968 UP || Lake Ladoga || 
|-id=575
| 2575 Bulgaria || 1970 PL || Bulgaria || 
|-id=576
| 2576 Yesenin || 1974 QL || Sergei Yesenin (1895–1925), a Russian lyric poet || 
|-id=577
| 2577 Litva ||  || Lithuanian Soviet Socialist Republic || 
|-id=578
| 2578 Saint-Exupéry ||  || Antoine de Saint-Exupéry (1900–1944), French writer || 
|-id=579
| 2579 Spartacus ||  || Spartacus (c. 111–71 BC), Roman revolutionary || 
|-id=580
| 2580 Smilevskia ||  || Moisei Vasil'evich Smilevskii (1913–1944), Ukrainian journalist || 
|-id=581
| 2581 Radegast || 1980 VX || Radegast, Slavic god || 
|-id=582
| 2582 Harimaya-Bashi || 1981 SA || Harimaya Bridge located in Kōchi, Japan || 
|-id=583
| 2583 Fatyanov ||  || Aleksej Ivanovich Fat'yanov (1919–1959), Soviet poet and songwriter || 
|-id=584
| 2584 Turkmenia ||  || Turkmenistan || 
|-id=585
| 2585 Irpedina ||  || The Irkutsk Pedagogical Institute in Russia || 
|-id=586
| 2586 Matson || 1980 LO || Dennis L. Matson, American planetary scientist at JPL || 
|-id=587
| 2587 Gardner || 1980 OH || Martin Gardner (1914–2010), American mathematician and writer || 
|-id=588
| 2588 Flavia || 1981 VQ || Flavius, Roman gens; also an asteroid in A Torrent of Faces by James Blish and Norman L. Knight || 
|-id=589
| 2589 Daniel ||  || Daniel Lagerkvist, son of the discoverer || 
|-id=590
| 2590 Mourão || 1980 KJ || Ronaldo Rogério de Freitas Mourão (1935–2014), Brazilian astronomer || 
|-id=591
| 2591 Dworetsky || 1949 PS || Michael M. Dworetsky, British astronomer || 
|-id=592
| 2592 Hunan || 1966 BW || Hunan, China || 
|-id=593
| 2593 Buryatia ||  || Republic of Buryatia, Russia || 
|-id=594
| 2594 Acamas || 1978 TB || Acamas, Thracian warrior and ally of Troy against the Greek during the Trojan War || 
|-id=595
| 2595 Gudiachvili || 1979 KL || Lado Gudiashvili (1896–1980), Georgian painter || 
|-id=596
| 2596 Vainu Bappu || 1979 KN || Vainu Bappu (1927–1982), Indian astrophysicist || 
|-id=597
| 2597 Arthur || 1980 PN || King Arthur, mythological British king || 
|-id=598
| 2598 Merlin || 1980 RY || Merlin, wizard in Arthurian legend || 
|-id=599
| 2599 Veselí || 1980 SO || Veselí nad Lužnicí, a town in the Czech Republic || 
|-id=600
| 2600 Lumme || 1980 VP || Kari Lumme, Finnish astronomer of the University of Helsinki || 
|}

2601–2700 

|-
| 2601 Bologna || 1980 XA || Bologna, Italy || 
|-id=602
| 2602 Moore || 1982 BR || Patrick Moore (1923–2012), British amateur astronomer || 
|-id=603
| 2603 Taylor ||  || Gordon E. Taylor, British amateur astronomer || 
|-id=604
| 2604 Marshak ||  || Samuil Marshak (1887–1964), Russian poet and writer || 
|-id=605
| 2605 Sahade || 1974 QA || Jorge Sahade (1915–2012), an Argentinian astronomer, director of the La Plata and Cordoba Observatories, and former president of the IAU during 1985–1988 || 
|-id=606
| 2606 Odessa ||  || Odessa, Ukraine || 
|-id=607
| 2607 Yakutia || 1977 NR || Sakha Republic (Sakha Yakutia Republic) in Russia || 
|-id=608
| 2608 Seneca || 1978 DA || Seneca the Younger (c. 4 BC – AD 65), Roman writer || 
|-id=609
| 2609 Kiril-Metodi ||  || Saints Cyril and Methodius (826–869 and 815–885), brothers, Byzantine Christian theologians and Christian missionaries, as well as inventors of Cyrillic || 
|-id=610
| 2610 Tuva ||  || Tuva Republic, Russia || 
|-id=611
| 2611 Boyce ||  || Joseph M. Boyce, American planetary scientist || 
|-id=612
| 2612 Kathryn || 1979 DE || Kathryn Gail Thomas-Hazelton, daughter of discoverer || 
|-id=613
| 2613 Plzeň || 1979 QE || Plzeň (Pilsen), Czech Republic, birthplace of the discoverer || 
|-id=614
| 2614 Torrence || 1980 LP || Torrence V. Johnson, American planetary scientist || 
|-id=615
| 2615 Saito || 1951 RJ || Keiji Saito, Japanese astrophysicist || 
|-id=616
| 2616 Lesya || 1970 QV || Larisa Petrovna Kosach(a.k.a. Lesya Ukrainka), Ukrainian poet || 
|-id=617
| 2617 Jiangxi ||  || Jiangxi, China || 
|-id=618
| 2618 Coonabarabran ||  || Coonabarabran, Australia. The Siding Spring Observatory of the Research School of Astronomy and Astrophysics of the Australian National University is located close by (40 km distant) || 
|-id=619
| 2619 Skalnaté Pleso ||  || Skalnaté Pleso, observatory in Slovakia || 
|-id=620
| 2620 Santana || 1980 TN || Carlos Santana (born 1947), American musician || 
|-id=621
| 2621 Goto || 1981 CA || Seizo Goto, businessman || 
|-id=622
| 2622 Bolzano || 1981 CM || Bernard Bolzano (1781–1848),  Bohemian mathematician and theologian || 
|-id=623
| 2623 Zech || A919 SA || Gert Zech (born 1941), German astronomer, member of the editorial team of Astronomy and Astrophysics Abstracts || 
|-id=624
| 2624 Samitchell || 1962 RE || Samuel Alfred Mitchell (1874–1960), American astronomer || 
|-id=625
| 2625 Jack London ||  || Jack London (1876–1916), American writer || 
|-id=626
| 2626 Belnika ||  || Nikolai Belyaev, Russian astronomer || 
|-id=627
| 2627 Churyumov ||  || Klim Ivanovich Churyumov, Ukrainian astronomer || 
|-id=628
| 2628 Kopal ||  || Zdeněk Kopal (1914–1993), Czech astronomer || 
|-id=629
| 2629 Rudra ||  || Rudra, destroyer aspect of the Hindu god Siva || 
|-id=630
| 2630 Hermod ||  || Hermóðr, hero in Norse mythology || 
|-id=631
| 2631 Zhejiang ||  || Zhejiang, China || 
|-id=632
| 2632 Guizhou ||  || Guizhou, China || 
|-id=633
| 2633 Bishop ||  || George Bishop (1785–1861), English wine merchant and patron of astronomy || 
|-id=634
| 2634 James Bradley || 1982 DL || James Bradley (1693–1762), English astronomer and Astronomer Royal || 
|-id=635
| 2635 Huggins || 1982 DS || William Huggins (1824–1910), English spectroscopist || 
|-id=636
| 2636 Lassell || 1982 DZ || William Lassell (1799–1880), English merchant and amateur astronomer || 
|-id=637
| 2637 Bobrovnikoff || A919 SB || Nicholas T. Bobrovnikoff, American astronomer || 
|-id=638
| 2638 Gadolin || 1939 SG || Jakob Gadolin (1719–1802), Swedish Lutheran bishop and astronomer, as well as Johan Gadolin (1760–1852), the "father of Finnish chemistry" || 
|-id=639
| 2639 Planman || 1940 GN || Anders Planman (1724–1803), Finnish astronomer || 
|-id=640
| 2640 Hällström || 1941 FN || Gustaf Gabriel Hällström (1775–1844), Finnish physicist || 
|-id=641
| 2641 Lipschutz || 1949 GJ || Michael E. Lipschutz, American geochemist || 
|-id=642
| 2642 Vésale || 1961 RA || Andreas Vesalius (1514–1564), Flemish anatomist || 
|-id=643
| 2643 Bernhard || 1973 SD || Prince Bernhard of Lippe-Biesterfeld (1911–2004), Dutch supporter of astronomy || 
|-id=644
| 2644 Victor Jara ||  || Víctor Jara (1932–1973), Chilean folk singer || 
|-id=645
| 2645 Daphne Plane || 1976 QD || Daphne Plane, librarian and friend of discoverer || 
|-id=646
| 2646 Abetti ||  || Antonio Abetti (1846–1928) and Giorgio Abetti (1882–1982), Italian astronomers || 
|-id=647
| 2647 Sova || 1980 SP || Antonín Sova (1864–1928), Czech poet || 
|-id=648
| 2648 Owa || 1980 VJ || Hopi for rock || 
|-id=649
| 2649 Oongaq || 1980 WA || Hopi for from up there || 
|-id=650
| 2650 Elinor || 1931 EG || Elinor Gates, assistant at the Minor Planet Center || 
|-id=651
| 2651 Karen || 1949 QD || Karen S. Mayer, sister-in-law of, and Karen S. Franz, friend of F. N. Bowman || 
|-id=652
| 2652 Yabuuti || 1953 GM || Kiyosi Yabuuti, Japanese astronomer and historian || 
|-id=653
| 2653 Principia || 1964 VP || Philosophiae Naturalis Principia Mathematica, Isaac Newton's magnum opus || 
|-id=654
| 2654 Ristenpart || 1968 OG || Friedrich Wilhelm Ristenpart (1868–1913), German astronomer || 
|-id=655
| 2655 Guangxi || 1974 XX || Guangxi, China || 
|-id=656
| 2656 Evenkia ||  || Evenk Autonomous Okrug, Russia || 
|-id=657
| 2657 Bashkiria ||  || Republic of Bashkortostan, Russia || 
|-id=658
| 2658 Gingerich || 1980 CK || Owen Gingerich (born 1930), American astrophysicist and historian of astronomy || 
|-id=659
| 2659 Millis || 1981 JX || Robert L. Millis, American astronomer || 
|-id=660
| 2660 Wasserman || 1982 FG || Lawrence H. Wasserman, American astronomer and discoverer of minor planets || 
|-id=661
| 2661 Bydžovský ||  || Bohumil Bydžovský (1880–1969), Czech mathematician || 
|-id=662
| 2662 Kandinsky || 4021 P-L || Wassily Kandinsky (1866–1944), Russian painter || 
|-id=663
| 2663 Miltiades || 6561 P-L || Miltiades (c. 550–489 BC), Athenian commander in ancient Greece || 
|-id=664
| 2664 Everhart || 1934 RR || Edgar Everhart, American astronomer and director of the Chamberlin Observatory || 
|-id=665
| 2665 Schrutka ||  || Guntram Schrutka (1910–1995), Austrian astronomer and professor of astronomy at Vienna University Src || 
|-id=666
| 2666 Gramme || 1951 TA || Zénobe Gramme (1826–1901), Belgian electrical engineer and inventor || 
|-id=667
| 2667 Oikawa || 1967 UO || Okuro Oikawa (1896–1980), Japanese astronomer and discoverer of minor planets || 
|-id=668
| 2668 Tataria || 1976 QV || Republic of Tatarstan, Russia || 
|-id=669
| 2669 Shostakovich ||  || Dmitri Shostakovich (1906–1975), Russian composer || 
|-id=670
| 2670 Chuvashia ||  || Chuvash Republic, Russia || 
|-id=671
| 2671 Abkhazia ||  || Abkhazia, Georgia || 
|-id=672
| 2672 Písek || 1979 KC || Písek, Czech Republic || 
|-id=673
| 2673 Lossignol || 1980 KN || Lossignol, family name of friends of discoverer || 
|-id=674
| 2674 Pandarus ||  || Pandarus, mythological Greek warrior || 
|-id=675
| 2675 Tolkien || 1982 GB || J. R. R. Tolkien (1892–1973), British writer || 
|-id=676
| 2676 Aarhus || 1933 QV || Aarhus, Denmark, seat of the Ole Rømer Observatory of the University of Aarhus || 
|-id=677
| 2677 Joan || 1935 FF || Joan Jordan, secretary at the Harvard-Smithsonian Center for Astrophysics || 
|-id=678
| 2678 Aavasaksa ||  || Aavasaksa, mountain in Finland (Lapland), one of the sites used by Maupertuis' expedition to determine the length of a degree of the meridian in 1736–1737 || 
|-id=679
| 2679 Kittisvaara || 1939 TG || Kittisvaara, mountain in Finland (Lapland), one of the sites used by Maupertuis' expedition to determine the length of a degree of the meridian in 1736–1737 || 
|-id=680
| 2680 Mateo || 1975 NF || José Mateo (1914–1978), Argentinian astronomer || 
|-id=681
| 2681 Ostrovskij ||  || Nikolai Ostrovsky (1904–1936), Soviet writer || 
|-id=682
| 2682 Soromundi ||  || From Latin for sisters of the world, after the YWCA || 
|-id=683
| 2683 Brian ||  || Eldest son of discoverer || 
|-id=684
| 2684 Douglas ||  || Douglas B. Thomas, American physicist at NIST and brother of astronomer Norman G. Thomas who discovered this minor planet || 
|-id=685
| 2685 Masursky || 1981 JN || Harold Masursky (1922–1990), American  geologist and astronomer || 
|-id=686
| 2686 Linda Susan ||  || Linda Susan Salazar, discoverer's youngest daughter || 
|-id=687
| 2687 Tortali || 1982 HG || Tortali, Vanuatun spirit of daytime || 
|-id=688
| 2688 Halley ||  || Edmond Halley (1656–1742), English astronomer || 
|-id=689
| 2689 Bruxelles || 1935 CF || Brussels, Belgium || 
|-id=690
| 2690 Ristiina ||  || Ristiina, Finland || 
|-id=691
| 2691 Sersic || 1974 KB || José Luis Sérsic (1933–1993), Argentinian astronomer || 
|-id=692
| 2692 Chkalov ||  || Valery Chkalov (1904–1938), Soviet test pilot || 
|-id=693
| 2693 Yan'an ||  || Yan'an, Shaanxi, China || 
|-id=694
| 2694 Pino Torinese ||  || Pino Torinese, Italy, site of Turin Observatory || 
|-id=695
| 2695 Christabel || 1979 UE || Christabel, poem by Samuel Taylor Coleridge || 
|-id=696
| 2696 Magion || 1980 HB || Magion 1, first Czech artificial satellite launched into orbit in 1978 || 
|-id=697
| 2697 Albina ||  || Albina Alekseevna Serova, friend of discoverer || 
|-id=698
| 2698 Azerbajdzhan || 1971 TZ || Azerbaijan || 
|-id=699
| 2699 Kalinin || 1976 YX || Mikhail Kalinin (1875–1946), Soviet statesman || 
|-id=700
| 2700 Baikonur ||  || Baikonur Cosmodrome, Kazakhstan || 
|}

2701–2800 

|-
| 2701 Cherson || 1978 RT || Kherson, Ukraine (not to be confused with Chersonesos, Crimea) || 
|-id=702
| 2702 Batrakov ||  || Yury Vasilyevich Batrakov, Russian astronomer and deputy director of the Institute for Theoretical Astronomy (ITA) || 
|-id=703
| 2703 Rodari ||  || Gianni Rodari (1920–1980), Italian writer || 
|-id=704
| 2704 Julian Loewe ||  || Julian Loewe, an American journalist and science writer for the Pasadena Star-News || 
|-id=705
| 2705 Wu ||  || Sherman S. C. Wu, photogrammetrist with the USGS || 
|-id=706
| 2706 Borovský || 1980 VW || Karel Havlíček Borovský (1821–1856), Czech writer and political journalist || 
|-id=707
| 2707 Ueferji ||  || Universidade Federal do Rio de Janeiro || 
|-id=708
| 2708 Burns || 1981 WT || Joseph A. Burns (born 1941), American astronomer and discoverer of minor planets || 
|-id=709
| 2709 Sagan || 1982 FH || Carl Sagan (1934–1996), American astronomer and author, co-founder of the Planetary Society || 
|-id=710
| 2710 Veverka || 1982 FQ || Joseph Veverka (born 1941), American astronomer || 
|-id=711
| 2711 Aleksandrov ||  || Anatoly Alexandrov (1903–1994), Russian physicist || 
|-id=712
| 2712 Keaton || 1937 YD || Buster Keaton (1895–1966), film comedian || 
|-id=713
| 2713 Luxembourg || 1938 EA || Luxembourg || 
|-id=714
| 2714 Matti || 1938 GC || Son of discoverer || 
|-id=715
| 2715 Mielikki || 1938 US || Mielikki from Finnish mythology || 
|-id=716
| 2716 Tuulikki || 1939 TM || Tuulikki from Finnish mythology, Goddess of the woods || 
|-id=717
| 2717 Tellervo || 1940 WJ || Tellervo from Finnish mythology || 
|-id=718
| 2718 Handley || 1951 OM || Tommy Handley (1892–1949), British radio comedian || 
|-id=719
| 2719 Suzhou || 1965 SU || Suzhou, Jiangsu, China || 
|-id=720
| 2720 Pyotr Pervyj ||  || Peter the Great (1672–1725), Russian tsar || 
|-id=721
| 2721 Vsekhsvyatskij ||  || Sergej Konstantinovich Vsekhsvyatskij, Soviet astronomer and professor at Kiev University || 
|-id=722
| 2722 Abalakin ||  || Viktor Kuzmich Abalakin, Russian astronomer at the Institute for Theoretical Astronomy (ITA) || 
|-id=723
| 2723 Gorshkov ||  || Pyotr Mikhaylovich Gorshkov (1883–1975), Russian astronomer and geodesist at Leningrad University || 
|-id=724
| 2724 Orlov ||  || Sergej Vladimirovich Orlov (1880–1958), professor at Moscow University, and Aleksandr Yakovlevich Orlov (1880–1954), founder and first director or the Golosseevo Astronomical Observatory || 
|-id=725
| 2725 David Bender ||  || David F. Bender, American astronomer, latterly of the Jet Propulsion Laboratory || 
|-id=726
| 2726 Kotelnikov ||  || Vladimir Kotelnikov (1908–2005), Russian radio engineer || 
|-id=727
| 2727 Paton ||  || Evgeny Paton (1870–1953) and Borys Paton (1918–), Soviet Ukrainian scientists || 
|-id=728
| 2728 Yatskiv ||  || Stepanovich Yatskiv, Ukrainian astrometrist and geodynamicist || 
|-id=729
| 2729 Urumqi ||  || Urumqi, Xinjiang, China || 
|-id=730
| 2730 Barks || 1981 QH || Carl Barks (1901–2000), American writer and illustrator || 
|-id=731
| 2731 Cucula || 1982 KJ || The cuckoo || 
|-id=732
| 2732 Witt || 1926 FG || Carl Gustav Witt (1866–1946), German astronomer and discoverer of minor planets || 
|-id=733
| 2733 Hamina || 1938 DQ || Hamina, Finland || 
|-id=734
| 2734 Hašek ||  || Jaroslav Hašek (1883–1923), Czech writer || 
|-id=735
| 2735 Ellen || 1977 RB || Ellen Howell (born 1961), American planetary scientist, discoverer of minor planets and of comet 88P/Howell. She was married to astronomer Schelte J. Bus. || 
|-id=736
| 2736 Ops || 1979 OC || Ops, Roman goddess || 
|-id=737
| 2737 Kotka || 1938 DU || Kotka, Finland || 
|-id=738
| 2738 Viracocha || 1940 EC || Viracocha, supreme god of the Inca || 
|-id=739
| 2739 Taguacipa ||  || Taguacipa, god of the Inca and companion of Viracocha || 
|-id=740
| 2740 Tsoj ||  || Viktor Tsoi (1962–1990), poet and rock musician || 
|-id=741
| 2741 Valdivia || 1975 XG || Pedro de Valdivia (1497–1553), Spanish conquistador and first governor of Chile || 
|-id=742
| 2742 Gibson ||  || James B. Gibson, American astronomer and discoverer of minor planets including 1943 Anteros || 
|-id=743
| 2743 Chengdu || 1965 WR || Chengdu, Sichuan, China || 
|-id=744
| 2744 Birgitta || 1975 RB || Anna Birgitta Angelica Lagerkvist, daughter of the discoverer || 
|-id=745
| 2745 San Martín ||  || José de San Martín (1778–1850), "father of Argentina" || 
|-id=746
| 2746 Hissao ||  || Hissar Astronomical Observatory, Dushanbe, Tajikistan || 
|-id=747
| 2747 Český Krumlov || 1980 DW || Český Krumlov, Czech Republic || 
|-id=748
| 2748 Patrick Gene ||  || Patrick Gene Shoemaker, son of discoverer || 
|-id=749
| 2749 Walterhorn || 1937 TD || Walter Horn (1908–1995), founder of the public observatory and amateur astronomical society in Solingen, Germany || 
|-id=750
| 2750 Loviisa || 1940 YK || Loviisa, Finland || 
|-id=751
| 2751 Campbell || 1962 RP || William Wallace Campbell (1862–1938), American astronomer || 
|-id=752
| 2752 Wu Chien-Shiung || 1965 SP || Chien-Shiung Wu (1912–1997), || 
|-id=753
| 2753 Duncan || 1966 DH || John Charles Duncan (1882–1967), American astronomer || 
|-id=754
| 2754 Efimov || 1966 PD || Mikhail Efimov (1881–1919), Russian pioneering aviator || 
|-id=755
| 2755 Avicenna ||  || Avicenna (c. 980–1037), medieval philosopher and scientist || 
|-id=756
| 2756 Dzhangar ||  || Epics of the Kalmyk people || 
|-id=757
| 2757 Crisser || 1977 VN || Cristina, wife of discoverer, and Sergio, discoverer || 
|-id=758
| 2758 Cordelia || 1978 RF || Cordelia, character in Shakespeare's King Lear || 
|-id=759
| 2759 Idomeneus || 1980 GC || Idomeneus, Greek warrior || 
|-id=760
| 2760 Kacha ||  || Kacha, cosmonaut training centre in the Crimea || 
|-id=761
| 2761 Eddington || 1981 AE || Arthur Eddington (1882–1944), British astrophysicist, on the occasion of the centennial of his birth || 
|-id=762
| 2762 Fowler || 1981 AT || Ralph H. Fowler (1889–1944), British astrophysicist || 
|-id=763
| 2763 Jeans || 1982 OG || James Jeans (1877–1946), British physicist, astronomer, and mathematician || 
|-id=764
| 2764 Moeller || 1981 CN || Sonia Louise Moeller-Thomas, mother of discoverer || 
|-id=765
| 2765 Dinant || 1981 EY || Dinant, Belgium || 
|-id=766
| 2766 Leeuwenhoek ||  || Antonie van Leeuwenhoek (1632–1723), Dutch scientist and "Father of Microbiology" || 
|-id=767
| 2767 Takenouchi || 1967 UM || Tadeo Takenouchi (born 1922), Japanese astronomer || 
|-id=768
| 2768 Gorky ||  || Maxim Gorky (1868–1936), Russian writer || 
|-id=769
| 2769 Mendeleev ||  || Dmitri Mendeleev (1834–1907), Russian chemist || 
|-id=770
| 2770 Tsvet ||  || Mikhail Tsvet (1872–1919), Russian-Italian physiologist and botanist who invented chromatography || 
|-id=771
| 2771 Polzunov ||  || Ivan Polzunov (1728–1766), Russian inventor || 
|-id=772
| 2772 Dugan || 1979 XE || Raymond Smith Dugan (1878–1940), American astronomer and discoverer of minor planets || 
|-id=773
| 2773 Brooks ||  || William Robert Brooks (1844–1921), American astronomer || 
|-id=774
| 2774 Tenojoki || 1942 TJ || Tenojoki, river || 
|-id=775
| 2775 Odishaw ||  || Hugh Odishaw (1916–1984), American geophysicist || 
|-id=776
| 2776 Baikal ||  || Lake Baikal, Russia || 
|-id=777
| 2777 Shukshin ||  || Vasilii Makarovich Shukshin (1929–1974), Russian writer and actor || 
|-id=778
| 2778 Tangshan || 1979 XP || Tangshan in China, location of a massive (Magnitude 7.8) earthquake in 1976 || 
|-id=779
| 2779 Mary || 1981 CX || Maryanna Ruth Thomas, wife of discoverer || 
|-id=780
| 2780 Monnig ||  || Oscar Monnig (1902–1999), American businessman, meteorite hunter and founder of the collection that bears his name. He donated the collection to Texas Christian University || 
|-id=781
| 2781 Kleczek || 1982 QH ||  (1923–2014), Czech astronomer || 
|-id=782
| 2782 Leonidas || 2605 P-L || Leonidas I (c. 540–480 BC), Spartan king in ancient Greece || 
|-id=783
| 2783 Chernyshevskij ||  || Nikolay Chernyshevsky (1828–1889), Russian writer and philosopher || 
|-id=784
| 2784 Domeyko || 1975 GA || Ignacy Domeyko (1802–1889), Polish-born chemist and mineralogist, latterly Rector of the University of Chile || 
|-id=785
| 2785 Sedov ||  || Leonid I. Sedov (1907–1999), Russian astronomer or Georgy Sedov, Russian polar explorer || 
|-id=786
| 2786 Grinevia ||  || Alexander Grin (1880–1932), Russian writer || 
|-id=787
| 2787 Tovarishch ||  || Tovarishch, Russian sailing ship || 
|-id=788
| 2788 Andenne || 1981 EL || Andenne, Belgium || 
|-id=789
| 2789 Foshan || 1956 XA || Foshan, Guangdong, China || 
|-id=790
| 2790 Needham ||  || Joseph Needham (1900–1995), British sinologist || 
|-id=791
| 2791 Paradise || 1977 CA || Paradise, California || 
|-id=792
| 2792 Ponomarev ||  || Nikolaj Georgievich Ponomarev (1900–1942), Russian designer of astronomical instruments || 
|-id=793
| 2793 Valdaj || 1977 QV || Valdai Hills, near Moscow || 
|-id=794
| 2794 Kulik ||  || Leonid Kulik (1883–1942), Russian mineralogist || 
|-id=795
| 2795 Lepage || 1979 YM || Théophile Lepage (1901–1991), Belgian mathematician || 
|-id=796
| 2796 Kron || 1980 EC || Gerald E. Kron, American astronomer at Lick Observatory and Flagstaff Station || 
|-id=797
| 2797 Teucer || 1981 LK || Teucer, Greek soldier || 
|-id=798
| 2798 Vergilius || 2009 P-L || Virgil, Roman poet || 
|-id=799
| 2799 Justus || 3071 P-L || Justus Cramer, descendant of H. G. van de Sande Bakhuyzen, Dutch astronomer || 
|-id=800
| 2800 Ovidius || 4585 P-L || Ovid, Roman poet || 
|}

2801–2900 

|-
| 2801 Huygens ||  || Christiaan Huygens (1629–1695), Dutch astronomer who studied Saturn's rings and discovered its moon Titan || 
|-id=802
| 2802 Weisell || 1939 BU || Weisell Väisälä, father of the discoverer, Yrjö Väisälä (1891–1971) || 
|-id=803
| 2803 Vilho || 1940 WG || Vilho Väisälä (1889–1969), Finnish meteorologist and physicist, brother of Kalle and Yrjö Väisälä || 
|-id=804
| 2804 Yrjö || 1941 HF || Yrjö Väisälä (1891–1971), Finnish astronomer and discoverer of minor planets, brother of Vilho and Kalle || 
|-id=805
| 2805 Kalle || 1941 UM || Kalle Väisälä (1893–1968), Finnish scientist, brother of Vilho and Yrjö || 
|-id=806
| 2806 Graz || 1953 GG || City of Graz, capital of the Austrian province of Styria || 
|-id=807
| 2807 Karl Marx ||  || Karl Marx (1818–1883), German philosopher and political economist || 
|-id=808
| 2808 Belgrano || 1976 HS || Manuel Belgrano (1770–1820), Argentine general || 
|-id=809
| 2809 Vernadskij ||  || Vladimir Vernadsky (1863–1945), Russian geochemist and mineralogist || 
|-id=810
| 2810 Lev Tolstoj ||  || Leo Tolstoy (1828–1910), Russian writer || 
|-id=811
| 2811 Střemchoví || 1980 JA || Střemchoví, a village in the Czech Republic, where the discoverer, Antonín Mrkos, was born || 
|-id=812
| 2812 Scaltriti || 1981 FN || Franco Scaltriti, Italian astronomer at the Observatory of Turin || 
|-id=813
| 2813 Zappalà || 1981 WZ || Vincenzo Zappalà (born 1945), Italian astronomer, discoverer of minor planets, and expert in the hierarchical clustering method to determine asteroid families || 
|-id=814
| 2814 Vieira ||  || Gilson Vieira, Brazilian astronomer at the Valongo Observatory || 
|-id=815
| 2815 Soma || 1982 RL || The Soma cube, mathematical game || 
|-id=816
| 2816 Pien || 1982 SO || Armand Pien, Belgian (Flemish) television meteorologist of the Royal Meteorological Institute in Uccle || 
|-id=817
| 2817 Perec || 1982 UJ || Georges Perec (1936–1982), French novelist, filmmaker and essayist || 
|-id=818
| 2818 Juvenalis || 2580 P-L || Juvenal, first and second-century Roman satirist || 
|-id=819
| 2819 Ensor || 1933 UR || James Ensor (1860–1949), Belgian expressionist painter || 
|-id=820
| 2820 Iisalmi || 1942 RU || Iisalmi, Finland || 
|-id=821
| 2821 Slávka || 1978 SQ || Sláva Vávrová, the discoverer's mother || 
|-id=822
| 2822 Sacajawea || 1980 EG || Sacagawea (1788–1812), Shoshone explorer || 
|-id=823
| 2823 van der Laan || 2010 P-L || Harry van der Laan, Dutch astrophysicist at the Leiden Observatory || 
|-id=824
| 2824 Franke || 1934 CZ || Ernst K. Franke, American biophysicist at the University of Cincinnati || 
|-id=825
| 2825 Crosby ||  || Bing Crosby (1903–1977), American singer and actor || 
|-id=826
| 2826 Ahti || 1939 UJ || Ahti, Finnish sea god || 
|-id=827
| 2827 Vellamo || 1942 CC || Vellamo, Finnish sea goddess, consort of Ahti || 
|-id=828
| 2828 Iku-Turso || 1942 DL || Iku-Turso, Finnish sea monster || 
|-id=829
| 2829 Bobhope || 1948 PK || Bob Hope (1903–2003), American comedian || 
|-id=830
| 2830 Greenwich || 1980 GA || Royal Greenwich Observatory, London, UK || 
|-id=831
| 2831 Stevin || 1930 SZ || Simon Stevin (1548–1620), Flemish scientist || 
|-id=832
| 2832 Lada ||  || Lada, Slavic goddess || 
|-id=833
| 2833 Radishchev ||  || Alexander Radishchev (1749–1802), Russian author and social critic || 
|-id=834
| 2834 Christy Carol ||  || Daughter of the discoverer || 
|-id=835
| 2835 Ryoma || 1982 WF || Sakamoto Ryōma (1836–1867), Japanese samurai || 
|-id=836
| 2836 Sobolev || 1978 YQ || Viktor Viktorovich Sobolev, Russian astrophysicist || 
|-id=837
| 2837 Griboedov ||  || Alexander Griboyedov (1795–1829), Russian playwright || 
|-id=838
| 2838 Takase ||  || Bunshiro Takase (1924–2015), Japanese astronomer || 
|-id=839
| 2839 Annette || 1929 TP || Daughter of the discoverer || 
|-id=840
| 2840 Kallavesi || 1941 UP || Lake Kallavesi, Finland || 
|-id=841
| 2841 Puijo || 1943 DM || Puijo Hill, Lake Kallavesi, Finland || 
|-id=842
| 2842 Unsöld || 1950 OD || Albrecht Unsöld (1905–1995), German astronomer || 
|-id=843
| 2843 Yeti || 1975 XQ || Yeti, cryptozoological Himalayan humanoid || 
|-id=844
| 2844 Hess || 1981 JP || Frederick Hess, American astronomer || 
|-id=845
| 2845 Franklinken || 1981 OF || Kenneth Franklin (1923–2007), American astronomer || 
|-id=846
| 2846 Ylppö || 1942 CJ || Arvo Ylppö (1887–1992), Finnish pediatrician || 
|-id=847
| 2847 Parvati ||  || Parvati, Hindu goddess, consort of Siva || 
|-id=848
| 2848 ASP || 1959 VF || Astronomical Society of the Pacific || 
|-id=849
| 2849 Shklovskij ||  || Iosif Shklovsky (1916–1985), Russian astronomer || 
|-id=850
| 2850 Mozhaiskij ||  || Alexander Mozhaysky (1825–1890), Russian aviation pioneer || 
|-id=851
| 2851 Harbin ||  || Harbin, China || 
|-id=852
| 2852 Declercq ||  || Maiden name of the discovere'rs wife || 
|-id=853
| 2853 Harvill || 1963 RG || Richard A. Harvill (1905–1988), astronomical supporter || 
|-id=854
| 2854 Rawson || 1964 JE || Guillermo Colesbery Rawson (1825–1890), Argentine physician || 
|-id=855
| 2855 Bastian ||  || Ulrich Bastian (born 1951), German astronomer || 
|-id=856
| 2856 Röser || 1933 GB || Siegfried Röser (born 1948), German astronomer || 
|-id=857
| 2857 NOT || 1942 DA || Nordic Optical Telescope || 
|-id=858
| 2858 Carlosporter || 1975 XB || Carlos Porter (1867–1942), Chilean zoologist || 
|-id=859
| 2859 Paganini ||  || Niccolò Paganini (1782–1840), Italian violinist || 
|-id=860
| 2860 Pasacentennium || 1978 TA || The U.S. city of Pasadena in California, on the occasion of its centennial anniversary of its incorporation into Los Angeles County in 1886 || 
|-id=861
| 2861 Lambrecht ||  || Hermann Lambrecht (1908–1983), German astronomer || 
|-id=862
| 2862 Vavilov || 1977 JP || Nikolai Vavilov (1887–1943), a Soviet botanist, as well as Sergey Vavilov (1891–1951), Soviet physicist || 
|-id=863
| 2863 Ben Mayer ||  || Ben Mayer (1925–1999), American astronomer || 
|-id=864
| 2864 Soderblom || 1983 AZ || Lawrence A. Soderblom, American planetary scientist with the United States Geological Survey || 
|-id=865
| 2865 Laurel || 1935 OK || Stan Laurel (1890–1965), British comedian || 
|-id=866
| 2866 Hardy || 1961 TA || Oliver Hardy (1892–1957), American comedian || 
|-id=867
| 2867 Šteins || 1969 VC || Kārlis Šteins (1911–1983), Latvian astronomer || 
|-id=868
| 2868 Upupa || 1972 UA || Upupa epops, the hoopoe || 
|-id=869
| 2869 Nepryadva ||  || Russian victory over Tataro-Mongols in the Battle of Kulikovo  near || 
|-id=870
| 2870 Haupt || 1981 LD || Hermann Haupt (1873–1959), Austrian astronomer || 
|-id=871
| 2871 Schober ||  || Hans Josef Schober, Austrian astronomer at the University of Graz || 
|-id=872
| 2872 Gentelec || 1981 RU || GTE Research Laboratories, Waltham, Massachusetts || 
|-id=873
| 2873 Binzel || 1982 FR || Richard P. Binzel (born 1958), American astronomer and discoverer of minor planets || 
|-id=874
| 2874 Jim Young || 1982 TH || James Whitney Young (born 1941), American astronomer and discoverer of minor planets || 
|-id=875
| 2875 Lagerkvist || 1983 CL || Claes-Ingvar Lagerkvist (born 1944), Swedish astronomer || 
|-id=876
| 2876 Aeschylus || 6558 P-L || Aeschylus, Greek playwright || 
|-id=877
| 2877 Likhachev ||  || Dmitry Likhachov (1906–1999), Soviet philologist || 
|-id=878
| 2878 Panacea || 1980 RX || Panacea, Roman goddess || 
|-id=879
| 2879 Shimizu ||  || Shin-ichi Shimizu (1889–) Japanese amateur astronomer || 
|-id=880
| 2880 Nihondaira || 1983 CA || Nihondaira, Shizuoka, Japan || 
|-id=881
| 2881 Meiden ||  || Medeina, Lithuanian god || 
|-id=882
| 2882 Tedesco || 1981 OG || Edward Francis Tedesco (Ed Tedesco), American astronomer and planetary scientist at JPL, PSI and member of the IAU (Src) || 
|-id=883
| 2883 Barabashov ||  || Nikolai P. Barabashov (1894–1971), Soviet astronomer || 
|-id=884
| 2884 Reddish ||  || Vincent Cartledge Reddish (1926–2015), British astronomer || 
|-id=885
| 2885 Palva || 1939 TC || Tauno Pavla, Finnish ear surgeon, son-in-law of astronomer Yrjö Väisälä, who discovered this minor planet || 
|-id=886
| 2886 Tinkaping || 1965 YG || Tin Ka Ping, Hong Kong industrialist || 
|-id=887
| 2887 Krinov ||  || Yevgeny Krinov (1906–1984), Soviet meteoriticist || 
|-id=888
| 2888 Hodgson || 1982 TO || Richard G. Hodgson, American astronomer and professor of physics at Dordt College, Sioux Center, Iowa || 
|-id=889
| 2889 Brno ||  || Brno, Czech Republic || 
|-id=890
| 2890 Vilyujsk ||  || Vilyuysk, Yakut ASSR, Russia || 
|-id=891
| 2891 McGetchin || 1980 MD || Thomas Richard McGetchin (1936–1979), American planetary scientist || 
|-id=892
| 2892 Filipenko ||  || Aleksandr Grigorevich Filipenko, Chief of Surgery at the hospital in Bakhchisarai on the Crimean peninsula || 
|-id=893
| 2893 Peiroos || 1975 QD || Peiroos (Peirous), Thracian war leader from the city of Aenus and an ally of King Priam against the Greek during the Trojan War || 
|-id=894
| 2894 Kakhovka ||  || Kakhovka, Ukraine || 
|-id=895
| 2895 Memnon ||  || Memnon, Ethiopian king, ally of Troy || 
|-id=896
| 2896 Preiss || 1931 RN || Gunter Preiss (born 1929), a German lawyer and administrator of the Max Planck Society who supported several astronomical projects such as the construction of the Calar Alto Observatory in Spain || 
|-id=897
| 2897 Ole Römer || 1932 CK || Ole Rømer (1644–1710), Danish astronomer || 
|-id=898
| 2898 Neuvo || 1938 DN || Yrjö Neuvo, grandson of Finnish astronomer Yrjö Väisälä, who discovered this minor planet || 
|-id=899
| 2899 Runrun Shaw ||  || Run Run Shaw (1907–2014), Chinese film producer || 
|-id=900
| 2900 Luboš Perek || 1972 AR || Luboš Perek (1919–2020), Czech astronomer || 
|}

2901–3000 

|-
| 2901 Bagehot || 1973 DP || Walter Bagehot (1826–1877), British writer || 
|-id=902
| 2902 Westerlund ||  || Bengt E. Westerlund, Swedish astronomer and director of the Uppsala Astronomical Observatory || 
|-id=903
| 2903 Zhuhai ||  || Zhuhai, China || 
|-id=904
| 2904 Millman || 1981 YB || Peter Millman (1906–1990), Canadian astronomer || 
|-id=905
| 2905 Plaskett ||  || John Stanley Plaskett (1865–1941), Canadian astronomer || 
|-id=906
| 2906 Caltech ||  || California Institute of Technology || 
|-id=907
| 2907 Nekrasov ||  || Nikolay Nekrasov (1821–1878), Russian poet || 
|-id=908
| 2908 Shimoyama || 1981 WA || Shimoyama, village in Japan || 
|-id=909
| 2909 Hoshi-no-ie || 1983 JA || Hoshi-no-ie Observatory, Japan; the name means 'star house' || 
|-id=910
| 2910 Yoshkar-Ola ||  || Yoshkar-Ola, Russia || 
|-id=911
| 2911 Miahelena || 1938 GJ || Miahelena, wife of Finnish astronomer Heikki A. Alikoski (1912–1997), who discovered this minor planet || 
|-id=912
| 2912 Lapalma || 1942 DM || La Palma, the Spanish island, home to many observatories || 
|-id=913
| 2913 Horta || 1931 TK || Victor Horta (1861–1947), Belgian architect || 
|-id=914
| 2914 Glärnisch || 1965 SB || Glärnisch mountain, summit of the Swiss Alps || 
|-id=915
| 2915 Moskvina ||  || Valentina Nikolaevna Moskvina, Russian doctor at the Bakhchisaraj regional hospital on the Crimean peninsula || 
|-id=916
| 2916 Voronveliya ||  || Boris Vorontsov-Velyaminov (1904–1994), Soviet–Russian astrophysicist and astronomer || 
|-id=917
| 2917 Sawyer Hogg || 1980 RR || Helen Sawyer Hogg (1905–1993), American-Canadian astronomer || 
|-id=918
| 2918 Salazar ||  || Frederick Salazar, son-in-law of astronomer Carolyn S. Shoemaker who discovered this minor planet || 
|-id=919
| 2919 Dali ||  || Salvador Dalí (1904–1989), Catalan-Spanish artist || 
|-id=920
| 2920 Automedon || 1981 JR || Automedon, mythological Greek soldier || 
|-id=921
| 2921 Sophocles || 6525 P-L || Sophocles (c. 496–405 BC), Greek dramatist || 
|-id=922
| 2922 Dikanʹka ||  || Gogol's Evenings on a Farm Near Dikanka || 
|-id=923
| 2923 Schuyler || 1977 DA || Catherine Schuyler, Minor Planet Center administrator || 
|-id=924
| 2924 Mitake-mura ||  || Mitake, a former village in Japan || 
|-id=925
| 2925 Beatty ||  || J. Kelly Beatty, astronomy writer and editor of Sky & Telescope || 
|-id=926
| 2926 Caldeira || 1980 KG || J.F.C. Caldeira, Brazilian astronomer at the Valongo Observatory and professor at the Universidade Federal do Rio de Janeiro || 
|-id=927
| 2927 Alamosa || 1981 TM || Alamosa, Colorado || 
|-id=928
| 2928 Epstein ||  || Isadore Epstein (1919–1995), Estonian–American astronomer || 
|-id=929
| 2929 Harris ||  || Alan W. Harris, American planetary scientist and pioneer in the study of rotational lightcurves of minor planets || 
|-id=930
| 2930 Euripides || 6554 P-L || Euripides (c. 480–406 BC), Greek dramatist || 
|-id=931
| 2931 Mayakovsky || 1969 UC || Vladimir Mayakovsky (1893–1930), Russian poet, artist and actor || 
|-id=932
| 2932 Kempchinsky ||  || Paula Kempchinsky, daughter-in-law of astronomer Carolyn S. Shoemaker who discovered this minor planet || 
|-id=933
| 2933 Amber || 1983 HN || Amber Marie Baltutis, granddaughter of astronomer Norman G. Thomas who discovered this minor planet || 
|-id=934
| 2934 Aristophanes || 4006 P-L || Aristophanes (c. 446–386 BC), Greek dramatist || 
|-id=935
| 2935 Naerum || 1976 UU || Nærum, a suburb north of Copenhagen || 
|-id=936
| 2936 Nechvíle || 1979 SF || Vincence Nechvíle (1890–1964), Czech astronomer || 
|-id=937
| 2937 Gibbs || 1980 LA || Josiah Willard Gibbs (1839–1903), American scientist || 
|-id=938
| 2938 Hopi || 1980 LB || The Hopi, the Native American people || 
|-id=939
| 2939 Coconino || 1982 DP || Coconino County, Arizona containing the Hopi and Navajo Nation Reservations. The Lowell Observatory is in the county seat, Flagstaff || 
|-id=940
| 2940 Bacon || 3042 P-L || Francis Bacon (1561–1626), English philosopher, statesman, and essayist || 
|-id=941
| 2941 Alden || 1930 YV || Alden, son of American astronomer Clyde Tombaugh, who discovered this minor planet || 
|-id=942
| 2942 Cordie || 1932 BG || Cordula "Cordie" Robinson, American planetary geologist || 
|-id=943
| 2943 Heinrich || 1933 QU || Inge Heinrich (born 1941), German astronomer || 
|-id=944
| 2944 Peyo || 1935 QF || Peyo, pseudonym of Pierre Culliford, Belgian illustrator || 
|-id=945
| 2945 Zanstra ||  || Herman Zanstra (1894–1972), Dutch astronomer || 
|-id=946
| 2946 Muchachos || 1941 UV || Roque de los Muchachos, site in the Canary Islands of several international observatories || 
|-id=947
| 2947 Kippenhahn ||  || Rudolf Kippenhahn (1926–2020), German  astrophysicist and science author || 
|-id=948
| 2948 Amosov ||  || Nikolai Mikhailovich Amosov, Ukrainian cardiologist || 
|-id=949
| 2949 Kaverznev || 1970 PR || Aleksandr Aleksandrovich Kaverznev (1932–1983), Soviet television journalist || 
|-id=950
| 2950 Rousseau ||  || Jean-Jacques Rousseau (1712–1778), Swiss philosopher from Geneva || 
|-id=951
| 2951 Perepadin ||  || Aleksandr Ivanovich Perepadin Soviet agriculturalist and friend of the discoverer, Nikolai Chernykh || 
|-id=952
| 2952 Lilliputia ||  || Lilliput, fictional land in Gulliver's Travels || 
|-id=953
| 2953 Vysheslavia ||  || Leonid Nikolaevich Vysheslavskii (Vysheslavsky), Soviet poet and author of "Stellar Sonnets" || 
|-id=954
| 2954 Delsemme ||  || Armand Hubert Delsemme, a Belgian-born astronomer at the University of Toledo in Ohio. ( was named for his wife.) || 
|-id=955
| 2955 Newburn ||  || Ray L. Newburn, American astronomer || 
|-id=956
| 2956 Yeomans ||  || Donald Keith Yeomans, American astronomer and celestial mechanician at the Jet Propulsion Laboratory || 
|-id=957
| 2957 Tatsuo ||  || Tatsuo Yamada (1923–2009), Japanese astronomer and observer of variable stars. He was the director of the variable star section of the Oriental Astronomical Association. || 
|-id=958
| 2958 Arpetito || 1981 DG || E. Araya, J. Perez, R. Tighe and A Torrecon, staff personnel at ESO's La Silla Observatory, who prepared the photographic plates for observations of minor planets with the "Grand Prism Objectif" || 
|-id=959
| 2959 Scholl ||  || Hans Scholl (born 1942), German astronomer and discoverer of minor planets. He worked at the Astronomisches Rechen-Institut in Heidelberg. || 
|-id=960
| 2960 Ohtaki ||  || Ohtaki, town in Japan || 
|-id=961
| 2961 Katsurahama || 1982 XA || Katsurahama, seashore resort in Kōchi, home city of the discoverer, Tsutomu Seki || 
|-id=962
| 2962 Otto || 1940 YF || The discoverer's great-grandfather || 
|-id=963
| 2963 Chen Jiageng ||  || Tan Kah Kee (Chen Jiageng; 1874–1961), Singaporean businessman, community leader, and philanthropist || 
|-id=964
| 2964 Jaschek ||  || Carlos Jaschek (1926–1999), German-born Argentinian astronomer || 
|-id=965
| 2965 Surikov || 1975 BX || Vasily Surikov (1848–1916), Russian painter || 
|-id=966
| 2966 Korsunia ||  || Korsun, Ukrainian city || 
|-id=967
| 2967 Vladisvyat ||  || Vladimir Svyatoslavich (c. 958–1015), medieval prince of Kiev || 
|-id=968
| 2968 Iliya || 1978 QJ || Ilya Muromets, legendary Russian hero || 
|-id=969
| 2969 Mikula ||  || Mikula Selyaninovich, Russian legendary hero || 
|-id=970
| 2970 Pestalozzi || 1978 UC || Johann Heinrich Pestalozzi (1746–1827), Swiss educational reformer || 
|-id=971
| 2971 Mohr || 1980 YL || Josef M. Mohr (1901–1979), Czech astronomer || 
|-id=972
| 2972 Niilo || 1939 TB || Niilo Anselmi Väisälä, great-grandson of the Finish discoverer, Yrjö Väisälä || 
|-id=973
| 2973 Paola || 1951 AJ || Her Majesty Queen Paola of Belgium (born 1937; née Ruffo di Calabria) || 
|-id=974
| 2974 Holden || 1955 QK || Edward S. Holden (1846–1914), American astronomer || 
|-id=975
| 2975 Spahr ||  || Timothy B. Spahr (born 1970), American astronomer || 
|-id=976
| 2976 Lautaro || 1974 HR || Lautaro (c. 1534–1557), leader of the Araucanians of Chile || 
|-id=977
| 2977 Chivilikhin || 1974 SP || Vladimir Alekseevich Chivilikhin (1928–1984), Russian author || 
|-id=978
| 2978 Roudebush || 1978 SR || Susan Roudebush, astronomical administrator || 
|-id=979
| 2979 Murmansk ||  || The port city of Murmansk in Russia || 
|-id=980
| 2980 Cameron ||  || Alastair G. W. Cameron (1925–2005), Canadian astrophysicist || 
|-id=981
| 2981 Chagall ||  || Marc Chagall (1887–1985), Belarusian artist || 
|-id=982
| 2982 Muriel ||  || Muriel May Scott Shoemaker, mother-in-law of American astronomer Carolyn S. Shoemaker, who discovered this minor planet || 
|-id=983
| 2983 Poltava ||  || Poltava, Ukrainian SSR (now Ukraine) || 
|-id=984
| 2984 Chaucer || 1981 YD || Geoffrey Chaucer (1343–1400), English poet and author || 
|-id=985
| 2985 Shakespeare ||  || William Shakespeare (1564–1616), English playwright || 
|-id=986
| 2986 Mrinalini || 2525 P-L || Mrinalini Sarabhai (1918–2016), classical Indian dancer and choreographer || 
|-id=987
| 2987 Sarabhai || 4583 P-L || Vikram Sarabhai (1919–1971), Indian space scientist || 
|-id=988
| 2988 Korhonen || 1943 EM || Tapio Korhonen, Finnish maker of telescopes and optics. He created the optical system of the Nordic Optical Telescope. || 
|-id=989
| 2989 Imago ||  || The Latin word for 'image' || 
|-id=990
| 2990 Trimberger ||  || Stephen Trimberger (born 1955), American astronomer and computer scientist || 
|-id=991
| 2991 Bilbo || 1982 HV || Bilbo Baggins, character in The Lord of the Rings || 
|-id=992
| 2992 Vondel || 2540 P-L || Joost van den Vondel (1587–1679), Dutch poet and playwright || 
|-id=993
| 2993 Wendy || 1970 PA || Wendy, wife of astronomer Peter Birch. This was the first discovered made at the Bickley-Perth Observatory || 
|-id=994
| 2994 Flynn || 1975 PA || Vicki Marie Flynn, wife of Mike Candy, who was a staff member at the Bickley-Perth Observatory || 
|-id=995
| 2995 Taratuta || 1978 QK || Evgeniya Aleksandrovna Taratuta, Soviet writer || 
|-id=996
| 2996 Bowman || 1954 RJ || Fred N. Bowman, American volunteer astronomer at the Cincinnati Observatory || 
|-id=997
| 2997 Cabrera || 1974 MJ || Laurentino Ascencio Cabrera (1917–2003), Argentinian astronomer || 
|-id=998
| 2998 Berendeya ||  || Berendeya, the magical land in The Snow Maiden by Alexander Ostrovsky || 
|-id=999
| 2999 Dante || 1981 CY || Dante Alighieri (c. 1265–1321), Italian poet from Florence || 
|-id=000
| 3000 Leonardo ||  || Leonardo da Vinci (1452–1519), Italian genius from Florence || 
|}

References 

002001-003000